

53001–53100 

|-bgcolor=#fefefe
| 53001 ||  || — || October 28, 1998 || Socorro || LINEAR || V || align=right | 1.4 km || 
|-id=002 bgcolor=#fefefe
| 53002 ||  || — || October 28, 1998 || Socorro || LINEAR || NYS || align=right | 1.7 km || 
|-id=003 bgcolor=#fefefe
| 53003 ||  || — || October 17, 1998 || Anderson Mesa || LONEOS || V || align=right | 1.4 km || 
|-id=004 bgcolor=#fefefe
| 53004 ||  || — || November 9, 1998 || Caussols || ODAS || — || align=right | 1.7 km || 
|-id=005 bgcolor=#fefefe
| 53005 ||  || — || November 10, 1998 || Caussols || ODAS || FLO || align=right | 1.7 km || 
|-id=006 bgcolor=#fefefe
| 53006 ||  || — || November 11, 1998 || Caussols || ODAS || NYS || align=right | 1.8 km || 
|-id=007 bgcolor=#fefefe
| 53007 ||  || — || November 11, 1998 || Socorro || LINEAR || — || align=right | 1.9 km || 
|-id=008 bgcolor=#fefefe
| 53008 ||  || — || November 13, 1998 || Lime Creek || R. Linderholm || — || align=right | 5.4 km || 
|-id=009 bgcolor=#fefefe
| 53009 ||  || — || November 12, 1998 || Oizumi || T. Kobayashi || — || align=right | 2.6 km || 
|-id=010 bgcolor=#fefefe
| 53010 ||  || — || November 10, 1998 || Socorro || LINEAR || — || align=right | 3.2 km || 
|-id=011 bgcolor=#fefefe
| 53011 ||  || — || November 10, 1998 || Socorro || LINEAR || — || align=right | 2.2 km || 
|-id=012 bgcolor=#E9E9E9
| 53012 ||  || — || November 10, 1998 || Socorro || LINEAR || — || align=right | 2.6 km || 
|-id=013 bgcolor=#E9E9E9
| 53013 ||  || — || November 10, 1998 || Socorro || LINEAR || EUN || align=right | 5.5 km || 
|-id=014 bgcolor=#fefefe
| 53014 ||  || — || November 10, 1998 || Socorro || LINEAR || NYS || align=right | 4.8 km || 
|-id=015 bgcolor=#fefefe
| 53015 ||  || — || November 10, 1998 || Socorro || LINEAR || — || align=right | 3.1 km || 
|-id=016 bgcolor=#fefefe
| 53016 ||  || — || November 10, 1998 || Socorro || LINEAR || V || align=right | 1.8 km || 
|-id=017 bgcolor=#fefefe
| 53017 ||  || — || November 10, 1998 || Socorro || LINEAR || FLO || align=right | 1.8 km || 
|-id=018 bgcolor=#fefefe
| 53018 ||  || — || November 10, 1998 || Socorro || LINEAR || NYS || align=right | 1.5 km || 
|-id=019 bgcolor=#fefefe
| 53019 ||  || — || November 11, 1998 || Chichibu || N. Satō || — || align=right | 2.5 km || 
|-id=020 bgcolor=#fefefe
| 53020 ||  || — || November 14, 1998 || Kitt Peak || Spacewatch || NYS || align=right | 1.9 km || 
|-id=021 bgcolor=#fefefe
| 53021 ||  || — || November 10, 1998 || Socorro || LINEAR || — || align=right | 2.8 km || 
|-id=022 bgcolor=#fefefe
| 53022 ||  || — || November 12, 1998 || Kushiro || S. Ueda, H. Kaneda || V || align=right | 2.3 km || 
|-id=023 bgcolor=#fefefe
| 53023 ||  || — || November 11, 1998 || Socorro || LINEAR || FLO || align=right | 2.0 km || 
|-id=024 bgcolor=#fefefe
| 53024 ||  || — || November 13, 1998 || Socorro || LINEAR || — || align=right | 2.5 km || 
|-id=025 bgcolor=#fefefe
| 53025 || 1998 WD || — || November 16, 1998 || Catalina || CSS || PHO || align=right | 3.3 km || 
|-id=026 bgcolor=#fefefe
| 53026 ||  || — || November 18, 1998 || Socorro || LINEAR || — || align=right | 2.7 km || 
|-id=027 bgcolor=#fefefe
| 53027 ||  || — || November 20, 1998 || Gekko || T. Kagawa || FLO || align=right | 2.1 km || 
|-id=028 bgcolor=#fefefe
| 53028 ||  || — || November 20, 1998 || Nachi-Katsuura || Y. Shimizu, T. Urata || — || align=right | 3.4 km || 
|-id=029 bgcolor=#fefefe
| 53029 Wodetzky ||  ||  || November 22, 1998 || Piszkéstető || K. Sárneczky, L. Kiss || — || align=right | 2.9 km || 
|-id=030 bgcolor=#fefefe
| 53030 ||  || — || November 18, 1998 || Kushiro || S. Ueda, H. Kaneda || — || align=right | 2.3 km || 
|-id=031 bgcolor=#E9E9E9
| 53031 ||  || — || November 23, 1998 || Oohira || T. Urata || — || align=right | 4.4 km || 
|-id=032 bgcolor=#fefefe
| 53032 ||  || — || November 25, 1998 || Oizumi || T. Kobayashi || — || align=right | 3.4 km || 
|-id=033 bgcolor=#fefefe
| 53033 ||  || — || November 26, 1998 || Višnjan Observatory || K. Korlević || V || align=right | 1.8 km || 
|-id=034 bgcolor=#fefefe
| 53034 ||  || — || November 21, 1998 || Socorro || LINEAR || V || align=right | 2.2 km || 
|-id=035 bgcolor=#fefefe
| 53035 ||  || — || November 21, 1998 || Socorro || LINEAR || MAS || align=right | 2.3 km || 
|-id=036 bgcolor=#fefefe
| 53036 ||  || — || November 21, 1998 || Socorro || LINEAR || — || align=right | 3.2 km || 
|-id=037 bgcolor=#fefefe
| 53037 ||  || — || November 21, 1998 || Socorro || LINEAR || — || align=right | 2.5 km || 
|-id=038 bgcolor=#fefefe
| 53038 ||  || — || November 21, 1998 || Socorro || LINEAR || NYS || align=right | 2.7 km || 
|-id=039 bgcolor=#fefefe
| 53039 ||  || — || November 21, 1998 || Socorro || LINEAR || V || align=right | 1.7 km || 
|-id=040 bgcolor=#fefefe
| 53040 ||  || — || November 21, 1998 || Socorro || LINEAR || — || align=right | 2.5 km || 
|-id=041 bgcolor=#fefefe
| 53041 ||  || — || November 18, 1998 || Socorro || LINEAR || FLO || align=right | 2.9 km || 
|-id=042 bgcolor=#fefefe
| 53042 ||  || — || November 18, 1998 || Socorro || LINEAR || EUT || align=right | 1.8 km || 
|-id=043 bgcolor=#fefefe
| 53043 ||  || — || November 18, 1998 || Socorro || LINEAR || — || align=right | 2.1 km || 
|-id=044 bgcolor=#fefefe
| 53044 ||  || — || November 18, 1998 || Socorro || LINEAR || NYS || align=right | 2.6 km || 
|-id=045 bgcolor=#fefefe
| 53045 ||  || — || November 18, 1998 || Socorro || LINEAR || — || align=right | 3.0 km || 
|-id=046 bgcolor=#fefefe
| 53046 ||  || — || November 18, 1998 || Socorro || LINEAR || NYS || align=right | 1.8 km || 
|-id=047 bgcolor=#fefefe
| 53047 ||  || — || November 18, 1998 || Socorro || LINEAR || — || align=right | 5.0 km || 
|-id=048 bgcolor=#fefefe
| 53048 ||  || — || November 21, 1998 || Kitt Peak || Spacewatch || — || align=right | 3.2 km || 
|-id=049 bgcolor=#fefefe
| 53049 ||  || — || November 17, 1998 || Socorro || LINEAR || PHO || align=right | 3.2 km || 
|-id=050 bgcolor=#fefefe
| 53050 ||  || — || November 18, 1998 || Socorro || LINEAR || V || align=right | 2.0 km || 
|-id=051 bgcolor=#fefefe
| 53051 ||  || — || December 12, 1998 || Oizumi || T. Kobayashi || V || align=right | 2.7 km || 
|-id=052 bgcolor=#E9E9E9
| 53052 ||  || — || December 11, 1998 || Kitt Peak || Spacewatch || MAR || align=right | 6.7 km || 
|-id=053 bgcolor=#fefefe
| 53053 ||  || — || December 12, 1998 || San Marcello || M. Tombelli, G. Forti || — || align=right | 1.5 km || 
|-id=054 bgcolor=#fefefe
| 53054 ||  || — || December 14, 1998 || Socorro || LINEAR || PHO || align=right | 3.1 km || 
|-id=055 bgcolor=#fefefe
| 53055 ||  || — || December 15, 1998 || Caussols || ODAS || — || align=right | 2.0 km || 
|-id=056 bgcolor=#E9E9E9
| 53056 ||  || — || December 15, 1998 || Caussols || ODAS || GER || align=right | 5.9 km || 
|-id=057 bgcolor=#fefefe
| 53057 ||  || — || December 10, 1998 || Ondřejov || L. Kotková || — || align=right | 2.0 km || 
|-id=058 bgcolor=#fefefe
| 53058 ||  || — || December 8, 1998 || Kitt Peak || Spacewatch || V || align=right | 1.8 km || 
|-id=059 bgcolor=#E9E9E9
| 53059 ||  || — || December 10, 1998 || Kitt Peak || Spacewatch || — || align=right | 3.8 km || 
|-id=060 bgcolor=#E9E9E9
| 53060 ||  || — || December 10, 1998 || Kitt Peak || Spacewatch || — || align=right | 4.7 km || 
|-id=061 bgcolor=#E9E9E9
| 53061 ||  || — || December 11, 1998 || Kitt Peak || Spacewatch || — || align=right | 2.9 km || 
|-id=062 bgcolor=#fefefe
| 53062 ||  || — || December 14, 1998 || Socorro || LINEAR || — || align=right | 3.0 km || 
|-id=063 bgcolor=#fefefe
| 53063 ||  || — || December 14, 1998 || Socorro || LINEAR || V || align=right | 2.0 km || 
|-id=064 bgcolor=#fefefe
| 53064 ||  || — || December 14, 1998 || Socorro || LINEAR || NYS || align=right | 6.4 km || 
|-id=065 bgcolor=#fefefe
| 53065 ||  || — || December 14, 1998 || Socorro || LINEAR || V || align=right | 2.4 km || 
|-id=066 bgcolor=#fefefe
| 53066 ||  || — || December 14, 1998 || Socorro || LINEAR || V || align=right | 2.3 km || 
|-id=067 bgcolor=#fefefe
| 53067 ||  || — || December 14, 1998 || Socorro || LINEAR || V || align=right | 4.4 km || 
|-id=068 bgcolor=#fefefe
| 53068 ||  || — || December 14, 1998 || Socorro || LINEAR || — || align=right | 4.5 km || 
|-id=069 bgcolor=#E9E9E9
| 53069 ||  || — || December 14, 1998 || Socorro || LINEAR || ADE || align=right | 6.4 km || 
|-id=070 bgcolor=#E9E9E9
| 53070 ||  || — || December 14, 1998 || Socorro || LINEAR || — || align=right | 4.2 km || 
|-id=071 bgcolor=#fefefe
| 53071 ||  || — || December 15, 1998 || Socorro || LINEAR || — || align=right | 2.3 km || 
|-id=072 bgcolor=#E9E9E9
| 53072 ||  || — || December 13, 1998 || Kitt Peak || Spacewatch || — || align=right | 4.2 km || 
|-id=073 bgcolor=#E9E9E9
| 53073 ||  || — || December 14, 1998 || Socorro || LINEAR || — || align=right | 5.0 km || 
|-id=074 bgcolor=#fefefe
| 53074 ||  || — || December 14, 1998 || Socorro || LINEAR || — || align=right | 3.6 km || 
|-id=075 bgcolor=#fefefe
| 53075 ||  || — || December 14, 1998 || Socorro || LINEAR || — || align=right | 4.5 km || 
|-id=076 bgcolor=#fefefe
| 53076 ||  || — || December 14, 1998 || Socorro || LINEAR || NYS || align=right | 2.1 km || 
|-id=077 bgcolor=#fefefe
| 53077 ||  || — || December 14, 1998 || Socorro || LINEAR || — || align=right | 2.4 km || 
|-id=078 bgcolor=#E9E9E9
| 53078 ||  || — || December 15, 1998 || Socorro || LINEAR || — || align=right | 6.5 km || 
|-id=079 bgcolor=#fefefe
| 53079 ||  || — || December 15, 1998 || Socorro || LINEAR || — || align=right | 2.2 km || 
|-id=080 bgcolor=#fefefe
| 53080 ||  || — || December 15, 1998 || Socorro || LINEAR || V || align=right | 2.1 km || 
|-id=081 bgcolor=#fefefe
| 53081 ||  || — || December 15, 1998 || Socorro || LINEAR || NYS || align=right | 1.5 km || 
|-id=082 bgcolor=#E9E9E9
| 53082 ||  || — || December 15, 1998 || Socorro || LINEAR || ADE || align=right | 5.6 km || 
|-id=083 bgcolor=#E9E9E9
| 53083 ||  || — || December 15, 1998 || Socorro || LINEAR || — || align=right | 2.4 km || 
|-id=084 bgcolor=#fefefe
| 53084 ||  || — || December 15, 1998 || Socorro || LINEAR || — || align=right | 3.3 km || 
|-id=085 bgcolor=#fefefe
| 53085 ||  || — || December 15, 1998 || Socorro || LINEAR || — || align=right | 5.2 km || 
|-id=086 bgcolor=#E9E9E9
| 53086 ||  || — || December 15, 1998 || Socorro || LINEAR || EUN || align=right | 4.3 km || 
|-id=087 bgcolor=#fefefe
| 53087 || 1998 YQ || — || December 16, 1998 || Oizumi || T. Kobayashi || NYS || align=right | 1.9 km || 
|-id=088 bgcolor=#E9E9E9
| 53088 ||  || — || December 18, 1998 || Caussols || ODAS || — || align=right | 6.7 km || 
|-id=089 bgcolor=#E9E9E9
| 53089 ||  || — || December 21, 1998 || Oizumi || T. Kobayashi || — || align=right | 4.5 km || 
|-id=090 bgcolor=#fefefe
| 53090 ||  || — || December 24, 1998 || Catalina || CSS || PHO || align=right | 4.9 km || 
|-id=091 bgcolor=#E9E9E9
| 53091 ||  || — || December 19, 1998 || Uenohara || N. Kawasato || — || align=right | 3.7 km || 
|-id=092 bgcolor=#fefefe
| 53092 ||  || — || December 27, 1998 || Oizumi || T. Kobayashi || — || align=right | 3.6 km || 
|-id=093 bgcolor=#fefefe
| 53093 La Orotava ||  ||  || December 28, 1998 || Kleť || J. Tichá, M. Tichý || — || align=right | 2.2 km || 
|-id=094 bgcolor=#E9E9E9
| 53094 ||  || — || December 16, 1998 || Kitt Peak || Spacewatch || — || align=right | 3.3 km || 
|-id=095 bgcolor=#fefefe
| 53095 ||  || — || December 22, 1998 || Kitt Peak || Spacewatch || NYS || align=right | 2.7 km || 
|-id=096 bgcolor=#E9E9E9
| 53096 ||  || — || December 22, 1998 || Kitt Peak || Spacewatch || EUN || align=right | 3.4 km || 
|-id=097 bgcolor=#E9E9E9
| 53097 ||  || — || December 23, 1998 || Kitt Peak || Spacewatch || EUN || align=right | 5.2 km || 
|-id=098 bgcolor=#fefefe
| 53098 ||  || — || December 29, 1998 || Xinglong || SCAP || — || align=right | 2.5 km || 
|-id=099 bgcolor=#E9E9E9
| 53099 ||  || — || December 27, 1998 || Anderson Mesa || LONEOS || — || align=right | 3.7 km || 
|-id=100 bgcolor=#E9E9E9
| 53100 ||  || — || December 24, 1998 || Anderson Mesa || LONEOS || HNS || align=right | 4.8 km || 
|}

53101–53200 

|-bgcolor=#d6d6d6
| 53101 || 1999 AY || — || January 7, 1999 || Oizumi || T. Kobayashi || EOS || align=right | 7.6 km || 
|-id=102 bgcolor=#E9E9E9
| 53102 || 1999 AZ || — || January 7, 1999 || Oizumi || T. Kobayashi || — || align=right | 3.1 km || 
|-id=103 bgcolor=#fefefe
| 53103 ||  || — || January 6, 1999 || Višnjan Observatory || K. Korlević || SUL || align=right | 4.9 km || 
|-id=104 bgcolor=#d6d6d6
| 53104 ||  || — || January 10, 1999 || Oizumi || T. Kobayashi || URS || align=right | 11 km || 
|-id=105 bgcolor=#E9E9E9
| 53105 ||  || — || January 10, 1999 || Oizumi || T. Kobayashi || — || align=right | 4.7 km || 
|-id=106 bgcolor=#fefefe
| 53106 ||  || — || January 6, 1999 || Višnjan Observatory || K. Korlević || FLO || align=right | 2.2 km || 
|-id=107 bgcolor=#E9E9E9
| 53107 ||  || — || January 11, 1999 || Oizumi || T. Kobayashi || — || align=right | 5.1 km || 
|-id=108 bgcolor=#E9E9E9
| 53108 ||  || — || January 11, 1999 || Oizumi || T. Kobayashi || — || align=right | 3.3 km || 
|-id=109 bgcolor=#E9E9E9
| 53109 Martinphillipps ||  ||  || January 12, 1999 || Cocoa || I. P. Griffin || BRU || align=right | 6.4 km || 
|-id=110 bgcolor=#FFC2E0
| 53110 ||  || — || January 11, 1999 || Socorro || LINEAR || AMO +1kmmoon || align=right | 1.6 km || 
|-id=111 bgcolor=#E9E9E9
| 53111 ||  || — || January 6, 1999 || Anderson Mesa || LONEOS || — || align=right | 6.4 km || 
|-id=112 bgcolor=#E9E9E9
| 53112 ||  || — || January 6, 1999 || Anderson Mesa || LONEOS || — || align=right | 3.3 km || 
|-id=113 bgcolor=#fefefe
| 53113 ||  || — || January 7, 1999 || Anderson Mesa || LONEOS || — || align=right | 2.1 km || 
|-id=114 bgcolor=#E9E9E9
| 53114 ||  || — || January 10, 1999 || Xinglong || SCAP || — || align=right | 3.7 km || 
|-id=115 bgcolor=#E9E9E9
| 53115 ||  || — || January 8, 1999 || Kitt Peak || Spacewatch || HEN || align=right | 2.9 km || 
|-id=116 bgcolor=#E9E9E9
| 53116 ||  || — || January 11, 1999 || Kitt Peak || Spacewatch || — || align=right | 2.6 km || 
|-id=117 bgcolor=#d6d6d6
| 53117 ||  || — || January 13, 1999 || Kitt Peak || Spacewatch || HYG || align=right | 7.0 km || 
|-id=118 bgcolor=#fefefe
| 53118 ||  || — || January 13, 1999 || Caussols || ODAS || — || align=right | 2.3 km || 
|-id=119 bgcolor=#fefefe
| 53119 ||  || — || January 13, 1999 || Caussols || ODAS || NYS || align=right | 1.3 km || 
|-id=120 bgcolor=#fefefe
| 53120 ||  || — || January 13, 1999 || Gekko || T. Kagawa || — || align=right | 3.4 km || 
|-id=121 bgcolor=#E9E9E9
| 53121 ||  || — || January 14, 1999 || Višnjan Observatory || K. Korlević || ADE || align=right | 7.6 km || 
|-id=122 bgcolor=#E9E9E9
| 53122 ||  || — || January 14, 1999 || Xinglong || SCAP || — || align=right | 3.4 km || 
|-id=123 bgcolor=#E9E9E9
| 53123 ||  || — || January 15, 1999 || Oizumi || T. Kobayashi || INO || align=right | 3.5 km || 
|-id=124 bgcolor=#d6d6d6
| 53124 ||  || — || January 14, 1999 || Višnjan Observatory || K. Korlević || — || align=right | 10 km || 
|-id=125 bgcolor=#E9E9E9
| 53125 ||  || — || January 15, 1999 || Catalina || CSS || BRU || align=right | 6.6 km || 
|-id=126 bgcolor=#d6d6d6
| 53126 ||  || — || January 15, 1999 || Caussols || ODAS || — || align=right | 3.8 km || 
|-id=127 bgcolor=#d6d6d6
| 53127 ||  || — || January 15, 1999 || Caussols || ODAS || — || align=right | 6.8 km || 
|-id=128 bgcolor=#d6d6d6
| 53128 ||  || — || January 15, 1999 || Caussols || ODAS || EOS || align=right | 5.7 km || 
|-id=129 bgcolor=#E9E9E9
| 53129 ||  || — || January 13, 1999 || Kitt Peak || Spacewatch || HEN || align=right | 2.6 km || 
|-id=130 bgcolor=#E9E9E9
| 53130 ||  || — || January 14, 1999 || Kitt Peak || Spacewatch || — || align=right | 3.1 km || 
|-id=131 bgcolor=#E9E9E9
| 53131 ||  || — || January 14, 1999 || Kitt Peak || Spacewatch || — || align=right | 7.7 km || 
|-id=132 bgcolor=#E9E9E9
| 53132 ||  || — || January 14, 1999 || Kitt Peak || Spacewatch || — || align=right | 3.5 km || 
|-id=133 bgcolor=#E9E9E9
| 53133 ||  || — || January 15, 1999 || Anderson Mesa || LONEOS || — || align=right | 3.3 km || 
|-id=134 bgcolor=#E9E9E9
| 53134 ||  || — || January 18, 1999 || Kleť || Kleť Obs. || — || align=right | 7.5 km || 
|-id=135 bgcolor=#E9E9E9
| 53135 ||  || — || January 19, 1999 || Oizumi || T. Kobayashi || — || align=right | 3.1 km || 
|-id=136 bgcolor=#E9E9E9
| 53136 ||  || — || January 19, 1999 || Oizumi || T. Kobayashi || — || align=right | 3.2 km || 
|-id=137 bgcolor=#E9E9E9
| 53137 ||  || — || January 19, 1999 || Caussols || ODAS || — || align=right | 4.9 km || 
|-id=138 bgcolor=#E9E9E9
| 53138 ||  || — || January 19, 1999 || Caussols || ODAS || — || align=right | 2.2 km || 
|-id=139 bgcolor=#E9E9E9
| 53139 ||  || — || January 18, 1999 || Catalina || CSS || — || align=right | 7.1 km || 
|-id=140 bgcolor=#E9E9E9
| 53140 ||  || — || January 20, 1999 || Višnjan Observatory || K. Korlević || — || align=right | 2.6 km || 
|-id=141 bgcolor=#E9E9E9
| 53141 ||  || — || January 21, 1999 || Caussols || ODAS || — || align=right | 7.9 km || 
|-id=142 bgcolor=#E9E9E9
| 53142 ||  || — || January 21, 1999 || Višnjan Observatory || K. Korlević || — || align=right | 2.7 km || 
|-id=143 bgcolor=#E9E9E9
| 53143 ||  || — || January 22, 1999 || Višnjan Observatory || K. Korlević || — || align=right | 4.8 km || 
|-id=144 bgcolor=#E9E9E9
| 53144 ||  || — || January 22, 1999 || Woomera || F. B. Zoltowski || — || align=right | 2.2 km || 
|-id=145 bgcolor=#E9E9E9
| 53145 ||  || — || January 24, 1999 || Farra d'Isonzo || Farra d'Isonzo || — || align=right | 2.2 km || 
|-id=146 bgcolor=#E9E9E9
| 53146 ||  || — || January 23, 1999 || Višnjan Observatory || K. Korlević || DOR || align=right | 6.2 km || 
|-id=147 bgcolor=#E9E9E9
| 53147 ||  || — || January 22, 1999 || Caussols || ODAS || — || align=right | 6.8 km || 
|-id=148 bgcolor=#E9E9E9
| 53148 ||  || — || January 18, 1999 || Uenohara || N. Kawasato || — || align=right | 2.4 km || 
|-id=149 bgcolor=#E9E9E9
| 53149 ||  || — || January 22, 1999 || Oohira || T. Urata || GEF || align=right | 3.1 km || 
|-id=150 bgcolor=#fefefe
| 53150 ||  || — || January 16, 1999 || Socorro || LINEAR || FLO || align=right | 2.2 km || 
|-id=151 bgcolor=#fefefe
| 53151 ||  || — || January 18, 1999 || Socorro || LINEAR || V || align=right | 2.2 km || 
|-id=152 bgcolor=#E9E9E9
| 53152 ||  || — || January 18, 1999 || Socorro || LINEAR || — || align=right | 3.9 km || 
|-id=153 bgcolor=#E9E9E9
| 53153 ||  || — || January 25, 1999 || Oohira || T. Urata || — || align=right | 4.4 km || 
|-id=154 bgcolor=#fefefe
| 53154 ||  || — || January 17, 1999 || Kitt Peak || Spacewatch || — || align=right | 2.0 km || 
|-id=155 bgcolor=#E9E9E9
| 53155 ||  || — || January 19, 1999 || Kitt Peak || Spacewatch || — || align=right | 3.4 km || 
|-id=156 bgcolor=#E9E9E9
| 53156 || 1999 CF || — || February 4, 1999 || Oizumi || T. Kobayashi || ADE || align=right | 7.2 km || 
|-id=157 bgcolor=#E9E9E9
| 53157 Akaishidake || 1999 CP ||  || February 5, 1999 || Mishima || M. Akiyama || — || align=right | 7.0 km || 
|-id=158 bgcolor=#E9E9E9
| 53158 ||  || — || February 7, 1999 || Oizumi || T. Kobayashi || MAR || align=right | 4.0 km || 
|-id=159 bgcolor=#fefefe
| 53159 Mysliveček ||  ||  || February 10, 1999 || Ondřejov || P. Pravec || V || align=right | 2.0 km || 
|-id=160 bgcolor=#E9E9E9
| 53160 ||  || — || February 11, 1999 || Oaxaca || J. M. Roe || — || align=right | 3.7 km || 
|-id=161 bgcolor=#E9E9E9
| 53161 ||  || — || February 10, 1999 || Socorro || LINEAR || BRU || align=right | 5.8 km || 
|-id=162 bgcolor=#E9E9E9
| 53162 ||  || — || February 10, 1999 || Socorro || LINEAR || HNS || align=right | 5.8 km || 
|-id=163 bgcolor=#d6d6d6
| 53163 ||  || — || February 13, 1999 || Oizumi || T. Kobayashi || — || align=right | 6.3 km || 
|-id=164 bgcolor=#E9E9E9
| 53164 ||  || — || February 14, 1999 || Reedy Creek || J. Broughton || — || align=right | 5.8 km || 
|-id=165 bgcolor=#d6d6d6
| 53165 ||  || — || February 12, 1999 || Bergisch Gladbach || W. Bickel || EOS || align=right | 7.1 km || 
|-id=166 bgcolor=#E9E9E9
| 53166 ||  || — || February 15, 1999 || Oizumi || T. Kobayashi || — || align=right | 6.0 km || 
|-id=167 bgcolor=#E9E9E9
| 53167 ||  || — || February 15, 1999 || Oizumi || T. Kobayashi || MAR || align=right | 4.6 km || 
|-id=168 bgcolor=#E9E9E9
| 53168 ||  || — || February 12, 1999 || Socorro || LINEAR || PAL || align=right | 9.9 km || 
|-id=169 bgcolor=#fefefe
| 53169 ||  || — || February 10, 1999 || Socorro || LINEAR || V || align=right | 2.4 km || 
|-id=170 bgcolor=#fefefe
| 53170 ||  || — || February 10, 1999 || Socorro || LINEAR || NYS || align=right | 6.3 km || 
|-id=171 bgcolor=#E9E9E9
| 53171 ||  || — || February 10, 1999 || Socorro || LINEAR || — || align=right | 5.3 km || 
|-id=172 bgcolor=#fefefe
| 53172 ||  || — || February 10, 1999 || Socorro || LINEAR || V || align=right | 3.3 km || 
|-id=173 bgcolor=#d6d6d6
| 53173 ||  || — || February 10, 1999 || Socorro || LINEAR || — || align=right | 9.1 km || 
|-id=174 bgcolor=#d6d6d6
| 53174 ||  || — || February 10, 1999 || Socorro || LINEAR || ALA || align=right | 10 km || 
|-id=175 bgcolor=#E9E9E9
| 53175 ||  || — || February 10, 1999 || Socorro || LINEAR || — || align=right | 5.6 km || 
|-id=176 bgcolor=#E9E9E9
| 53176 ||  || — || February 10, 1999 || Socorro || LINEAR || — || align=right | 3.2 km || 
|-id=177 bgcolor=#d6d6d6
| 53177 ||  || — || February 10, 1999 || Socorro || LINEAR || BRA || align=right | 5.1 km || 
|-id=178 bgcolor=#fefefe
| 53178 ||  || — || February 10, 1999 || Socorro || LINEAR || CHL || align=right | 6.3 km || 
|-id=179 bgcolor=#fefefe
| 53179 ||  || — || February 10, 1999 || Socorro || LINEAR || — || align=right | 7.5 km || 
|-id=180 bgcolor=#E9E9E9
| 53180 ||  || — || February 10, 1999 || Socorro || LINEAR || JUN || align=right | 3.4 km || 
|-id=181 bgcolor=#E9E9E9
| 53181 ||  || — || February 10, 1999 || Socorro || LINEAR || — || align=right | 4.1 km || 
|-id=182 bgcolor=#E9E9E9
| 53182 ||  || — || February 10, 1999 || Socorro || LINEAR || — || align=right | 4.4 km || 
|-id=183 bgcolor=#E9E9E9
| 53183 ||  || — || February 10, 1999 || Socorro || LINEAR || — || align=right | 5.0 km || 
|-id=184 bgcolor=#E9E9E9
| 53184 ||  || — || February 10, 1999 || Socorro || LINEAR || — || align=right | 4.2 km || 
|-id=185 bgcolor=#E9E9E9
| 53185 ||  || — || February 10, 1999 || Socorro || LINEAR || EUN || align=right | 5.8 km || 
|-id=186 bgcolor=#d6d6d6
| 53186 ||  || — || February 10, 1999 || Socorro || LINEAR || EOS || align=right | 5.6 km || 
|-id=187 bgcolor=#E9E9E9
| 53187 ||  || — || February 10, 1999 || Socorro || LINEAR || — || align=right | 6.3 km || 
|-id=188 bgcolor=#E9E9E9
| 53188 ||  || — || February 10, 1999 || Socorro || LINEAR || RAF || align=right | 2.5 km || 
|-id=189 bgcolor=#E9E9E9
| 53189 ||  || — || February 10, 1999 || Socorro || LINEAR || GEF || align=right | 3.8 km || 
|-id=190 bgcolor=#E9E9E9
| 53190 ||  || — || February 10, 1999 || Socorro || LINEAR || — || align=right | 4.7 km || 
|-id=191 bgcolor=#E9E9E9
| 53191 ||  || — || February 10, 1999 || Socorro || LINEAR || EUN || align=right | 3.2 km || 
|-id=192 bgcolor=#E9E9E9
| 53192 ||  || — || February 10, 1999 || Socorro || LINEAR || — || align=right | 4.2 km || 
|-id=193 bgcolor=#E9E9E9
| 53193 ||  || — || February 10, 1999 || Socorro || LINEAR || — || align=right | 5.2 km || 
|-id=194 bgcolor=#E9E9E9
| 53194 ||  || — || February 10, 1999 || Socorro || LINEAR || — || align=right | 4.8 km || 
|-id=195 bgcolor=#E9E9E9
| 53195 ||  || — || February 10, 1999 || Socorro || LINEAR || — || align=right | 5.2 km || 
|-id=196 bgcolor=#E9E9E9
| 53196 ||  || — || February 10, 1999 || Socorro || LINEAR || — || align=right | 4.4 km || 
|-id=197 bgcolor=#d6d6d6
| 53197 ||  || — || February 10, 1999 || Socorro || LINEAR || EOS || align=right | 6.1 km || 
|-id=198 bgcolor=#fefefe
| 53198 ||  || — || February 12, 1999 || Socorro || LINEAR || — || align=right | 3.9 km || 
|-id=199 bgcolor=#E9E9E9
| 53199 ||  || — || February 12, 1999 || Socorro || LINEAR || — || align=right | 7.3 km || 
|-id=200 bgcolor=#E9E9E9
| 53200 ||  || — || February 12, 1999 || Socorro || LINEAR || — || align=right | 3.5 km || 
|}

53201–53300 

|-bgcolor=#E9E9E9
| 53201 ||  || — || February 12, 1999 || Socorro || LINEAR || — || align=right | 6.0 km || 
|-id=202 bgcolor=#E9E9E9
| 53202 ||  || — || February 12, 1999 || Socorro || LINEAR || — || align=right | 3.6 km || 
|-id=203 bgcolor=#E9E9E9
| 53203 ||  || — || February 12, 1999 || Socorro || LINEAR || — || align=right | 4.5 km || 
|-id=204 bgcolor=#E9E9E9
| 53204 ||  || — || February 12, 1999 || Socorro || LINEAR || MAR || align=right | 2.8 km || 
|-id=205 bgcolor=#E9E9E9
| 53205 ||  || — || February 12, 1999 || Socorro || LINEAR || — || align=right | 8.5 km || 
|-id=206 bgcolor=#E9E9E9
| 53206 ||  || — || February 12, 1999 || Socorro || LINEAR || — || align=right | 3.9 km || 
|-id=207 bgcolor=#E9E9E9
| 53207 ||  || — || February 12, 1999 || Socorro || LINEAR || — || align=right | 3.7 km || 
|-id=208 bgcolor=#d6d6d6
| 53208 ||  || — || February 12, 1999 || Socorro || LINEAR || — || align=right | 7.3 km || 
|-id=209 bgcolor=#E9E9E9
| 53209 ||  || — || February 12, 1999 || Socorro || LINEAR || PAE || align=right | 9.7 km || 
|-id=210 bgcolor=#E9E9E9
| 53210 ||  || — || February 12, 1999 || Socorro || LINEAR || ADE || align=right | 7.4 km || 
|-id=211 bgcolor=#E9E9E9
| 53211 ||  || — || February 12, 1999 || Socorro || LINEAR || EUN || align=right | 3.5 km || 
|-id=212 bgcolor=#E9E9E9
| 53212 ||  || — || February 12, 1999 || Socorro || LINEAR || EUN || align=right | 3.9 km || 
|-id=213 bgcolor=#E9E9E9
| 53213 ||  || — || February 12, 1999 || Socorro || LINEAR || — || align=right | 3.4 km || 
|-id=214 bgcolor=#fefefe
| 53214 ||  || — || February 10, 1999 || Socorro || LINEAR || V || align=right | 2.1 km || 
|-id=215 bgcolor=#E9E9E9
| 53215 ||  || — || February 10, 1999 || Socorro || LINEAR || — || align=right | 3.3 km || 
|-id=216 bgcolor=#E9E9E9
| 53216 ||  || — || February 10, 1999 || Socorro || LINEAR || GER || align=right | 5.7 km || 
|-id=217 bgcolor=#E9E9E9
| 53217 ||  || — || February 10, 1999 || Socorro || LINEAR || — || align=right | 5.5 km || 
|-id=218 bgcolor=#E9E9E9
| 53218 ||  || — || February 10, 1999 || Socorro || LINEAR || EUN || align=right | 3.3 km || 
|-id=219 bgcolor=#E9E9E9
| 53219 ||  || — || February 10, 1999 || Socorro || LINEAR || — || align=right | 5.3 km || 
|-id=220 bgcolor=#E9E9E9
| 53220 ||  || — || February 10, 1999 || Socorro || LINEAR || — || align=right | 5.9 km || 
|-id=221 bgcolor=#E9E9E9
| 53221 ||  || — || February 10, 1999 || Socorro || LINEAR || — || align=right | 6.3 km || 
|-id=222 bgcolor=#E9E9E9
| 53222 ||  || — || February 10, 1999 || Socorro || LINEAR || MAR || align=right | 4.4 km || 
|-id=223 bgcolor=#d6d6d6
| 53223 ||  || — || February 10, 1999 || Socorro || LINEAR || — || align=right | 5.1 km || 
|-id=224 bgcolor=#fefefe
| 53224 ||  || — || February 10, 1999 || Socorro || LINEAR || — || align=right | 3.8 km || 
|-id=225 bgcolor=#E9E9E9
| 53225 ||  || — || February 10, 1999 || Socorro || LINEAR || — || align=right | 8.0 km || 
|-id=226 bgcolor=#E9E9E9
| 53226 ||  || — || February 10, 1999 || Socorro || LINEAR || — || align=right | 2.9 km || 
|-id=227 bgcolor=#E9E9E9
| 53227 ||  || — || February 10, 1999 || Socorro || LINEAR || AST || align=right | 6.8 km || 
|-id=228 bgcolor=#E9E9E9
| 53228 ||  || — || February 10, 1999 || Socorro || LINEAR || — || align=right | 6.8 km || 
|-id=229 bgcolor=#E9E9E9
| 53229 ||  || — || February 10, 1999 || Socorro || LINEAR || — || align=right | 6.0 km || 
|-id=230 bgcolor=#E9E9E9
| 53230 ||  || — || February 12, 1999 || Socorro || LINEAR || — || align=right | 2.9 km || 
|-id=231 bgcolor=#d6d6d6
| 53231 ||  || — || February 12, 1999 || Socorro || LINEAR || EOS || align=right | 5.0 km || 
|-id=232 bgcolor=#d6d6d6
| 53232 ||  || — || February 12, 1999 || Socorro || LINEAR || — || align=right | 8.5 km || 
|-id=233 bgcolor=#E9E9E9
| 53233 ||  || — || February 12, 1999 || Socorro || LINEAR || EUN || align=right | 5.0 km || 
|-id=234 bgcolor=#E9E9E9
| 53234 ||  || — || February 12, 1999 || Socorro || LINEAR || — || align=right | 3.5 km || 
|-id=235 bgcolor=#E9E9E9
| 53235 ||  || — || February 12, 1999 || Socorro || LINEAR || — || align=right | 7.1 km || 
|-id=236 bgcolor=#E9E9E9
| 53236 ||  || — || February 12, 1999 || Socorro || LINEAR || — || align=right | 4.5 km || 
|-id=237 bgcolor=#d6d6d6
| 53237 Simonson ||  ||  || February 9, 1999 || Goodricke-Pigott || R. A. Tucker || — || align=right | 5.3 km || 
|-id=238 bgcolor=#E9E9E9
| 53238 ||  || — || February 11, 1999 || Socorro || LINEAR || — || align=right | 12 km || 
|-id=239 bgcolor=#E9E9E9
| 53239 ||  || — || February 11, 1999 || Socorro || LINEAR || — || align=right | 4.0 km || 
|-id=240 bgcolor=#E9E9E9
| 53240 ||  || — || February 11, 1999 || Socorro || LINEAR || — || align=right | 4.0 km || 
|-id=241 bgcolor=#E9E9E9
| 53241 ||  || — || February 11, 1999 || Socorro || LINEAR || EUN || align=right | 3.3 km || 
|-id=242 bgcolor=#E9E9E9
| 53242 ||  || — || February 11, 1999 || Kitt Peak || Spacewatch || — || align=right | 3.4 km || 
|-id=243 bgcolor=#E9E9E9
| 53243 ||  || — || February 9, 1999 || Kitt Peak || Spacewatch || — || align=right | 3.5 km || 
|-id=244 bgcolor=#E9E9E9
| 53244 ||  || — || February 8, 1999 || Kitt Peak || Spacewatch || — || align=right | 5.5 km || 
|-id=245 bgcolor=#d6d6d6
| 53245 ||  || — || February 12, 1999 || Kitt Peak || Spacewatch || — || align=right | 4.5 km || 
|-id=246 bgcolor=#E9E9E9
| 53246 ||  || — || February 18, 1999 || Haleakala || NEAT || — || align=right | 3.0 km || 
|-id=247 bgcolor=#E9E9E9
| 53247 ||  || — || February 17, 1999 || Reedy Creek || J. Broughton || EUN || align=right | 5.6 km || 
|-id=248 bgcolor=#d6d6d6
| 53248 ||  || — || February 21, 1999 || Oizumi || T. Kobayashi || — || align=right | 5.3 km || 
|-id=249 bgcolor=#E9E9E9
| 53249 ||  || — || February 20, 1999 || Prescott || P. G. Comba || MRX || align=right | 2.4 km || 
|-id=250 bgcolor=#d6d6d6
| 53250 Beucher ||  ||  || February 20, 1999 || Goodricke-Pigott || R. A. Tucker || — || align=right | 5.8 km || 
|-id=251 bgcolor=#d6d6d6
| 53251 ||  || — || March 12, 1999 || Kitt Peak || Spacewatch || EOS || align=right | 4.2 km || 
|-id=252 bgcolor=#E9E9E9
| 53252 Sardegna ||  ||  || March 13, 1999 || Gnosca || S. Sposetti || — || align=right | 6.5 km || 
|-id=253 bgcolor=#E9E9E9
| 53253 Zeiler ||  ||  || March 13, 1999 || Goodricke-Pigott || R. A. Tucker || HEN || align=right | 3.9 km || 
|-id=254 bgcolor=#d6d6d6
| 53254 ||  || — || March 14, 1999 || Kitt Peak || Spacewatch || EOS || align=right | 3.4 km || 
|-id=255 bgcolor=#d6d6d6
| 53255 ||  || — || March 14, 1999 || Kitt Peak || Spacewatch || — || align=right | 10 km || 
|-id=256 bgcolor=#E9E9E9
| 53256 Sinitiere || 1999 FD ||  || March 16, 1999 || Baton Rouge || W. R. Cooney Jr. || — || align=right | 3.8 km || 
|-id=257 bgcolor=#d6d6d6
| 53257 || 1999 FF || — || March 16, 1999 || Baton Rouge || W. R. Cooney Jr. || KOR || align=right | 4.8 km || 
|-id=258 bgcolor=#E9E9E9
| 53258 || 1999 FN || — || March 17, 1999 || Caussols || ODAS || EUN || align=right | 4.3 km || 
|-id=259 bgcolor=#d6d6d6
| 53259 ||  || — || March 16, 1999 || Kitt Peak || Spacewatch || EOS || align=right | 3.8 km || 
|-id=260 bgcolor=#d6d6d6
| 53260 ||  || — || March 16, 1999 || Kitt Peak || Spacewatch || HYG || align=right | 6.4 km || 
|-id=261 bgcolor=#d6d6d6
| 53261 ||  || — || March 17, 1999 || Kitt Peak || Spacewatch || KOR || align=right | 3.1 km || 
|-id=262 bgcolor=#E9E9E9
| 53262 ||  || — || March 16, 1999 || Caussols || ODAS || — || align=right | 2.4 km || 
|-id=263 bgcolor=#d6d6d6
| 53263 ||  || — || March 25, 1999 || Ondřejov || L. Kotková || EMA || align=right | 10 km || 
|-id=264 bgcolor=#E9E9E9
| 53264 ||  || — || March 20, 1999 || Socorro || LINEAR || — || align=right | 5.7 km || 
|-id=265 bgcolor=#d6d6d6
| 53265 ||  || — || March 17, 1999 || Kitt Peak || Spacewatch || — || align=right | 7.8 km || 
|-id=266 bgcolor=#d6d6d6
| 53266 ||  || — || March 18, 1999 || Kitt Peak || Spacewatch || — || align=right | 5.1 km || 
|-id=267 bgcolor=#E9E9E9
| 53267 ||  || — || March 23, 1999 || Kitt Peak || Spacewatch || — || align=right | 6.3 km || 
|-id=268 bgcolor=#d6d6d6
| 53268 ||  || — || March 22, 1999 || Anderson Mesa || LONEOS || — || align=right | 7.5 km || 
|-id=269 bgcolor=#E9E9E9
| 53269 ||  || — || March 22, 1999 || Anderson Mesa || LONEOS || — || align=right | 3.5 km || 
|-id=270 bgcolor=#E9E9E9
| 53270 ||  || — || March 19, 1999 || Socorro || LINEAR || — || align=right | 4.2 km || 
|-id=271 bgcolor=#E9E9E9
| 53271 ||  || — || March 19, 1999 || Socorro || LINEAR || — || align=right | 5.2 km || 
|-id=272 bgcolor=#d6d6d6
| 53272 ||  || — || March 19, 1999 || Socorro || LINEAR || THB || align=right | 11 km || 
|-id=273 bgcolor=#d6d6d6
| 53273 ||  || — || March 19, 1999 || Socorro || LINEAR || EOS || align=right | 7.2 km || 
|-id=274 bgcolor=#E9E9E9
| 53274 ||  || — || March 19, 1999 || Socorro || LINEAR || — || align=right | 3.6 km || 
|-id=275 bgcolor=#d6d6d6
| 53275 ||  || — || March 19, 1999 || Socorro || LINEAR || CHA || align=right | 5.6 km || 
|-id=276 bgcolor=#E9E9E9
| 53276 ||  || — || March 19, 1999 || Socorro || LINEAR || — || align=right | 6.5 km || 
|-id=277 bgcolor=#E9E9E9
| 53277 ||  || — || March 24, 1999 || Višnjan Observatory || K. Korlević || — || align=right | 6.1 km || 
|-id=278 bgcolor=#E9E9E9
| 53278 ||  || — || March 19, 1999 || Socorro || LINEAR || DOR || align=right | 6.2 km || 
|-id=279 bgcolor=#E9E9E9
| 53279 ||  || — || March 19, 1999 || Socorro || LINEAR || — || align=right | 4.3 km || 
|-id=280 bgcolor=#E9E9E9
| 53280 ||  || — || March 19, 1999 || Socorro || LINEAR || — || align=right | 5.8 km || 
|-id=281 bgcolor=#E9E9E9
| 53281 ||  || — || March 19, 1999 || Socorro || LINEAR || — || align=right | 8.3 km || 
|-id=282 bgcolor=#E9E9E9
| 53282 ||  || — || March 19, 1999 || Socorro || LINEAR || — || align=right | 4.7 km || 
|-id=283 bgcolor=#E9E9E9
| 53283 ||  || — || March 20, 1999 || Socorro || LINEAR || — || align=right | 4.0 km || 
|-id=284 bgcolor=#E9E9E9
| 53284 ||  || — || March 20, 1999 || Socorro || LINEAR || RAF || align=right | 5.1 km || 
|-id=285 bgcolor=#d6d6d6
| 53285 Mojmír ||  ||  || March 24, 1999 || Ondřejov || Ondřejov Obs. || — || align=right | 7.2 km || 
|-id=286 bgcolor=#E9E9E9
| 53286 ||  || — || March 20, 1999 || Socorro || LINEAR || MAR || align=right | 4.1 km || 
|-id=287 bgcolor=#d6d6d6
| 53287 || 1999 GR || — || April 5, 1999 || Višnjan Observatory || K. Korlević || — || align=right | 6.7 km || 
|-id=288 bgcolor=#d6d6d6
| 53288 ||  || — || April 6, 1999 || Kitt Peak || Spacewatch || KOR || align=right | 4.9 km || 
|-id=289 bgcolor=#E9E9E9
| 53289 ||  || — || April 7, 1999 || Nachi-Katsuura || Y. Shimizu, T. Urata || — || align=right | 4.1 km || 
|-id=290 bgcolor=#d6d6d6
| 53290 ||  || — || April 10, 1999 || Anderson Mesa || LONEOS || — || align=right | 5.7 km || 
|-id=291 bgcolor=#d6d6d6
| 53291 ||  || — || April 11, 1999 || Kitt Peak || Spacewatch || THM || align=right | 6.2 km || 
|-id=292 bgcolor=#d6d6d6
| 53292 ||  || — || April 11, 1999 || Kitt Peak || Spacewatch || THM || align=right | 5.2 km || 
|-id=293 bgcolor=#d6d6d6
| 53293 ||  || — || April 14, 1999 || Kitt Peak || Spacewatch || THM || align=right | 6.3 km || 
|-id=294 bgcolor=#E9E9E9
| 53294 ||  || — || April 15, 1999 || Socorro || LINEAR || GEF || align=right | 4.6 km || 
|-id=295 bgcolor=#E9E9E9
| 53295 ||  || — || April 15, 1999 || Socorro || LINEAR || — || align=right | 3.7 km || 
|-id=296 bgcolor=#E9E9E9
| 53296 ||  || — || April 6, 1999 || Socorro || LINEAR || — || align=right | 6.6 km || 
|-id=297 bgcolor=#E9E9E9
| 53297 ||  || — || April 6, 1999 || Socorro || LINEAR || — || align=right | 3.6 km || 
|-id=298 bgcolor=#d6d6d6
| 53298 ||  || — || April 6, 1999 || Socorro || LINEAR || KOR || align=right | 6.5 km || 
|-id=299 bgcolor=#d6d6d6
| 53299 ||  || — || April 7, 1999 || Socorro || LINEAR || KOR || align=right | 3.5 km || 
|-id=300 bgcolor=#d6d6d6
| 53300 ||  || — || April 7, 1999 || Socorro || LINEAR || — || align=right | 5.7 km || 
|}

53301–53400 

|-bgcolor=#E9E9E9
| 53301 ||  || — || April 6, 1999 || Socorro || LINEAR || — || align=right | 3.0 km || 
|-id=302 bgcolor=#E9E9E9
| 53302 ||  || — || April 6, 1999 || Socorro || LINEAR || MAR || align=right | 4.0 km || 
|-id=303 bgcolor=#d6d6d6
| 53303 ||  || — || April 12, 1999 || Socorro || LINEAR || EOS || align=right | 8.6 km || 
|-id=304 bgcolor=#E9E9E9
| 53304 ||  || — || April 6, 1999 || Anderson Mesa || LONEOS || ADE || align=right | 7.7 km || 
|-id=305 bgcolor=#E9E9E9
| 53305 ||  || — || April 11, 1999 || Anderson Mesa || LONEOS || — || align=right | 7.1 km || 
|-id=306 bgcolor=#d6d6d6
| 53306 ||  || — || April 24, 1999 || Reedy Creek || J. Broughton || EOS || align=right | 6.3 km || 
|-id=307 bgcolor=#E9E9E9
| 53307 ||  || — || April 20, 1999 || Kitt Peak || Spacewatch || — || align=right | 3.5 km || 
|-id=308 bgcolor=#E9E9E9
| 53308 ||  || — || April 16, 1999 || Socorro || LINEAR || — || align=right | 4.6 km || 
|-id=309 bgcolor=#d6d6d6
| 53309 ||  || — || April 17, 1999 || Socorro || LINEAR || — || align=right | 3.8 km || 
|-id=310 bgcolor=#d6d6d6
| 53310 ||  || — || April 17, 1999 || Socorro || LINEAR || — || align=right | 8.9 km || 
|-id=311 bgcolor=#C2E0FF
| 53311 Deucalion ||  ||  || April 18, 1999 || Kitt Peak || DES || cubewano (cold)critical || align=right | 203 km || 
|-id=312 bgcolor=#E9E9E9
| 53312 || 1999 JZ || — || May 7, 1999 || Socorro || LINEAR || — || align=right | 9.9 km || 
|-id=313 bgcolor=#d6d6d6
| 53313 ||  || — || May 8, 1999 || Catalina || CSS || — || align=right | 5.1 km || 
|-id=314 bgcolor=#E9E9E9
| 53314 ||  || — || May 7, 1999 || Xinglong || SCAP || INO || align=right | 3.4 km || 
|-id=315 bgcolor=#E9E9E9
| 53315 ||  || — || May 10, 1999 || High Point || D. K. Chesney || ADE || align=right | 8.6 km || 
|-id=316 bgcolor=#d6d6d6
| 53316 Michielford ||  ||  || May 9, 1999 || Farpoint || G. Hug || — || align=right | 3.4 km || 
|-id=317 bgcolor=#E9E9E9
| 53317 ||  || — || May 13, 1999 || Socorro || LINEAR || — || align=right | 9.0 km || 
|-id=318 bgcolor=#E9E9E9
| 53318 ||  || — || May 13, 1999 || Reedy Creek || J. Broughton || EUN || align=right | 4.6 km || 
|-id=319 bgcolor=#FFC2E0
| 53319 ||  || — || May 13, 1999 || Socorro || LINEAR || APO +1kmPHAslow || align=right | 7.0 km || 
|-id=320 bgcolor=#d6d6d6
| 53320 ||  || — || May 14, 1999 || Prescott || P. G. Comba || EOS || align=right | 4.7 km || 
|-id=321 bgcolor=#E9E9E9
| 53321 ||  || — || May 8, 1999 || Catalina || CSS || — || align=right | 3.9 km || 
|-id=322 bgcolor=#E9E9E9
| 53322 ||  || — || May 15, 1999 || Catalina || CSS || — || align=right | 5.2 km || 
|-id=323 bgcolor=#d6d6d6
| 53323 ||  || — || May 15, 1999 || Kitt Peak || Spacewatch || EOS || align=right | 6.3 km || 
|-id=324 bgcolor=#d6d6d6
| 53324 ||  || — || May 10, 1999 || Socorro || LINEAR || — || align=right | 8.7 km || 
|-id=325 bgcolor=#d6d6d6
| 53325 ||  || — || May 10, 1999 || Socorro || LINEAR || — || align=right | 8.8 km || 
|-id=326 bgcolor=#d6d6d6
| 53326 ||  || — || May 10, 1999 || Socorro || LINEAR || — || align=right | 6.4 km || 
|-id=327 bgcolor=#E9E9E9
| 53327 ||  || — || May 10, 1999 || Socorro || LINEAR || — || align=right | 7.4 km || 
|-id=328 bgcolor=#E9E9E9
| 53328 ||  || — || May 10, 1999 || Socorro || LINEAR || — || align=right | 3.7 km || 
|-id=329 bgcolor=#d6d6d6
| 53329 ||  || — || May 10, 1999 || Socorro || LINEAR || — || align=right | 3.4 km || 
|-id=330 bgcolor=#d6d6d6
| 53330 ||  || — || May 10, 1999 || Socorro || LINEAR || — || align=right | 7.3 km || 
|-id=331 bgcolor=#d6d6d6
| 53331 ||  || — || May 10, 1999 || Socorro || LINEAR || EOS || align=right | 8.7 km || 
|-id=332 bgcolor=#E9E9E9
| 53332 ||  || — || May 10, 1999 || Socorro || LINEAR || — || align=right | 5.0 km || 
|-id=333 bgcolor=#d6d6d6
| 53333 ||  || — || May 10, 1999 || Socorro || LINEAR || EOS || align=right | 5.5 km || 
|-id=334 bgcolor=#d6d6d6
| 53334 ||  || — || May 13, 1999 || Socorro || LINEAR || EOS || align=right | 4.4 km || 
|-id=335 bgcolor=#d6d6d6
| 53335 ||  || — || May 10, 1999 || Socorro || LINEAR || — || align=right | 5.8 km || 
|-id=336 bgcolor=#d6d6d6
| 53336 ||  || — || May 10, 1999 || Socorro || LINEAR || — || align=right | 13 km || 
|-id=337 bgcolor=#E9E9E9
| 53337 ||  || — || May 10, 1999 || Socorro || LINEAR || slow || align=right | 8.9 km || 
|-id=338 bgcolor=#d6d6d6
| 53338 ||  || — || May 10, 1999 || Socorro || LINEAR || — || align=right | 7.9 km || 
|-id=339 bgcolor=#d6d6d6
| 53339 ||  || — || May 10, 1999 || Socorro || LINEAR || KOR || align=right | 5.4 km || 
|-id=340 bgcolor=#d6d6d6
| 53340 ||  || — || May 10, 1999 || Socorro || LINEAR || — || align=right | 9.0 km || 
|-id=341 bgcolor=#d6d6d6
| 53341 ||  || — || May 10, 1999 || Socorro || LINEAR || EOS || align=right | 7.1 km || 
|-id=342 bgcolor=#E9E9E9
| 53342 ||  || — || May 10, 1999 || Socorro || LINEAR || — || align=right | 3.4 km || 
|-id=343 bgcolor=#E9E9E9
| 53343 ||  || — || May 10, 1999 || Socorro || LINEAR || — || align=right | 6.1 km || 
|-id=344 bgcolor=#E9E9E9
| 53344 ||  || — || May 10, 1999 || Socorro || LINEAR || EUN || align=right | 5.0 km || 
|-id=345 bgcolor=#E9E9E9
| 53345 ||  || — || May 10, 1999 || Socorro || LINEAR || — || align=right | 7.5 km || 
|-id=346 bgcolor=#d6d6d6
| 53346 ||  || — || May 10, 1999 || Socorro || LINEAR || — || align=right | 10 km || 
|-id=347 bgcolor=#d6d6d6
| 53347 ||  || — || May 10, 1999 || Socorro || LINEAR || — || align=right | 14 km || 
|-id=348 bgcolor=#E9E9E9
| 53348 ||  || — || May 10, 1999 || Socorro || LINEAR || — || align=right | 6.8 km || 
|-id=349 bgcolor=#d6d6d6
| 53349 ||  || — || May 10, 1999 || Socorro || LINEAR || — || align=right | 5.9 km || 
|-id=350 bgcolor=#d6d6d6
| 53350 ||  || — || May 12, 1999 || Socorro || LINEAR || SAN || align=right | 5.2 km || 
|-id=351 bgcolor=#d6d6d6
| 53351 ||  || — || May 12, 1999 || Socorro || LINEAR || — || align=right | 7.7 km || 
|-id=352 bgcolor=#E9E9E9
| 53352 ||  || — || May 12, 1999 || Socorro || LINEAR || — || align=right | 7.0 km || 
|-id=353 bgcolor=#d6d6d6
| 53353 ||  || — || May 12, 1999 || Socorro || LINEAR || — || align=right | 5.3 km || 
|-id=354 bgcolor=#d6d6d6
| 53354 ||  || — || May 12, 1999 || Socorro || LINEAR || — || align=right | 8.6 km || 
|-id=355 bgcolor=#d6d6d6
| 53355 ||  || — || May 12, 1999 || Socorro || LINEAR || EOS || align=right | 6.5 km || 
|-id=356 bgcolor=#d6d6d6
| 53356 ||  || — || May 12, 1999 || Socorro || LINEAR || — || align=right | 6.5 km || 
|-id=357 bgcolor=#E9E9E9
| 53357 ||  || — || May 12, 1999 || Socorro || LINEAR || — || align=right | 4.2 km || 
|-id=358 bgcolor=#d6d6d6
| 53358 ||  || — || May 12, 1999 || Socorro || LINEAR || — || align=right | 11 km || 
|-id=359 bgcolor=#d6d6d6
| 53359 ||  || — || May 12, 1999 || Socorro || LINEAR || EOS || align=right | 5.8 km || 
|-id=360 bgcolor=#E9E9E9
| 53360 ||  || — || May 10, 1999 || Socorro || LINEAR || — || align=right | 6.9 km || 
|-id=361 bgcolor=#E9E9E9
| 53361 ||  || — || May 10, 1999 || Socorro || LINEAR || — || align=right | 5.1 km || 
|-id=362 bgcolor=#d6d6d6
| 53362 ||  || — || May 12, 1999 || Socorro || LINEAR || — || align=right | 7.6 km || 
|-id=363 bgcolor=#E9E9E9
| 53363 ||  || — || May 12, 1999 || Socorro || LINEAR || — || align=right | 5.4 km || 
|-id=364 bgcolor=#d6d6d6
| 53364 ||  || — || May 12, 1999 || Socorro || LINEAR || EOS || align=right | 8.2 km || 
|-id=365 bgcolor=#E9E9E9
| 53365 ||  || — || May 13, 1999 || Socorro || LINEAR || — || align=right | 5.1 km || 
|-id=366 bgcolor=#d6d6d6
| 53366 ||  || — || May 13, 1999 || Socorro || LINEAR || EUP || align=right | 13 km || 
|-id=367 bgcolor=#d6d6d6
| 53367 ||  || — || May 12, 1999 || Socorro || LINEAR || — || align=right | 9.4 km || 
|-id=368 bgcolor=#E9E9E9
| 53368 ||  || — || May 14, 1999 || Socorro || LINEAR || INO || align=right | 4.8 km || 
|-id=369 bgcolor=#fefefe
| 53369 ||  || — || May 12, 1999 || Socorro || LINEAR || — || align=right | 2.1 km || 
|-id=370 bgcolor=#E9E9E9
| 53370 ||  || — || May 12, 1999 || Socorro || LINEAR || — || align=right | 6.0 km || 
|-id=371 bgcolor=#E9E9E9
| 53371 ||  || — || May 12, 1999 || Socorro || LINEAR || EUN || align=right | 4.0 km || 
|-id=372 bgcolor=#E9E9E9
| 53372 ||  || — || May 12, 1999 || Socorro || LINEAR || — || align=right | 6.6 km || 
|-id=373 bgcolor=#E9E9E9
| 53373 ||  || — || May 12, 1999 || Socorro || LINEAR || — || align=right | 4.0 km || 
|-id=374 bgcolor=#E9E9E9
| 53374 ||  || — || May 12, 1999 || Socorro || LINEAR || — || align=right | 5.4 km || 
|-id=375 bgcolor=#E9E9E9
| 53375 ||  || — || May 12, 1999 || Socorro || LINEAR || — || align=right | 6.2 km || 
|-id=376 bgcolor=#d6d6d6
| 53376 ||  || — || May 12, 1999 || Socorro || LINEAR || — || align=right | 6.3 km || 
|-id=377 bgcolor=#d6d6d6
| 53377 ||  || — || May 12, 1999 || Socorro || LINEAR || KOR || align=right | 5.1 km || 
|-id=378 bgcolor=#d6d6d6
| 53378 ||  || — || May 12, 1999 || Socorro || LINEAR || EOS || align=right | 7.0 km || 
|-id=379 bgcolor=#E9E9E9
| 53379 ||  || — || May 12, 1999 || Socorro || LINEAR || — || align=right | 4.3 km || 
|-id=380 bgcolor=#d6d6d6
| 53380 ||  || — || May 12, 1999 || Socorro || LINEAR || — || align=right | 6.1 km || 
|-id=381 bgcolor=#E9E9E9
| 53381 ||  || — || May 12, 1999 || Socorro || LINEAR || — || align=right | 7.0 km || 
|-id=382 bgcolor=#d6d6d6
| 53382 ||  || — || May 12, 1999 || Socorro || LINEAR || — || align=right | 5.6 km || 
|-id=383 bgcolor=#d6d6d6
| 53383 ||  || — || May 12, 1999 || Socorro || LINEAR || — || align=right | 9.1 km || 
|-id=384 bgcolor=#d6d6d6
| 53384 ||  || — || May 12, 1999 || Socorro || LINEAR || — || align=right | 7.4 km || 
|-id=385 bgcolor=#d6d6d6
| 53385 ||  || — || May 12, 1999 || Socorro || LINEAR || — || align=right | 10 km || 
|-id=386 bgcolor=#d6d6d6
| 53386 ||  || — || May 12, 1999 || Socorro || LINEAR || — || align=right | 11 km || 
|-id=387 bgcolor=#d6d6d6
| 53387 ||  || — || May 12, 1999 || Socorro || LINEAR || — || align=right | 7.6 km || 
|-id=388 bgcolor=#E9E9E9
| 53388 ||  || — || May 12, 1999 || Socorro || LINEAR || — || align=right | 6.2 km || 
|-id=389 bgcolor=#d6d6d6
| 53389 ||  || — || May 12, 1999 || Socorro || LINEAR || — || align=right | 6.1 km || 
|-id=390 bgcolor=#E9E9E9
| 53390 ||  || — || May 12, 1999 || Socorro || LINEAR || EUN || align=right | 3.7 km || 
|-id=391 bgcolor=#d6d6d6
| 53391 ||  || — || May 12, 1999 || Socorro || LINEAR || EUP || align=right | 11 km || 
|-id=392 bgcolor=#d6d6d6
| 53392 ||  || — || May 12, 1999 || Socorro || LINEAR || — || align=right | 6.0 km || 
|-id=393 bgcolor=#E9E9E9
| 53393 ||  || — || May 13, 1999 || Socorro || LINEAR || — || align=right | 5.4 km || 
|-id=394 bgcolor=#d6d6d6
| 53394 ||  || — || May 13, 1999 || Socorro || LINEAR || — || align=right | 5.6 km || 
|-id=395 bgcolor=#d6d6d6
| 53395 ||  || — || May 13, 1999 || Socorro || LINEAR || — || align=right | 3.6 km || 
|-id=396 bgcolor=#d6d6d6
| 53396 ||  || — || May 15, 1999 || Socorro || LINEAR || — || align=right | 4.5 km || 
|-id=397 bgcolor=#d6d6d6
| 53397 ||  || — || May 13, 1999 || Socorro || LINEAR || EOS || align=right | 5.0 km || 
|-id=398 bgcolor=#d6d6d6
| 53398 ||  || — || May 13, 1999 || Socorro || LINEAR || HYG || align=right | 6.1 km || 
|-id=399 bgcolor=#d6d6d6
| 53399 ||  || — || May 13, 1999 || Socorro || LINEAR || — || align=right | 4.7 km || 
|-id=400 bgcolor=#d6d6d6
| 53400 ||  || — || May 13, 1999 || Socorro || LINEAR || EOS || align=right | 5.1 km || 
|}

53401–53500 

|-bgcolor=#d6d6d6
| 53401 ||  || — || May 13, 1999 || Socorro || LINEAR || — || align=right | 11 km || 
|-id=402 bgcolor=#d6d6d6
| 53402 ||  || — || May 13, 1999 || Socorro || LINEAR || — || align=right | 17 km || 
|-id=403 bgcolor=#d6d6d6
| 53403 || 1999 KM || — || May 16, 1999 || Catalina || CSS || — || align=right | 11 km || 
|-id=404 bgcolor=#E9E9E9
| 53404 || 1999 KX || — || May 17, 1999 || Catalina || CSS || — || align=right | 4.5 km || 
|-id=405 bgcolor=#d6d6d6
| 53405 ||  || — || May 18, 1999 || Socorro || LINEAR || — || align=right | 4.7 km || 
|-id=406 bgcolor=#d6d6d6
| 53406 ||  || — || May 18, 1999 || Socorro || LINEAR || THM || align=right | 7.2 km || 
|-id=407 bgcolor=#d6d6d6
| 53407 ||  || — || May 18, 1999 || Socorro || LINEAR || EOS || align=right | 6.1 km || 
|-id=408 bgcolor=#d6d6d6
| 53408 ||  || — || June 7, 1999 || Kitt Peak || Spacewatch || ALA || align=right | 6.8 km || 
|-id=409 bgcolor=#FFC2E0
| 53409 ||  || — || June 10, 1999 || Catalina || CSS || APO || align=right data-sort-value="0.65" | 650 m || 
|-id=410 bgcolor=#d6d6d6
| 53410 ||  || — || June 14, 1999 || Socorro || LINEAR || URS || align=right | 7.9 km || 
|-id=411 bgcolor=#E9E9E9
| 53411 ||  || — || June 6, 1999 || Anderson Mesa || LONEOS || EUN || align=right | 4.5 km || 
|-id=412 bgcolor=#E9E9E9
| 53412 ||  || — || July 12, 1999 || Socorro || LINEAR || — || align=right | 11 km || 
|-id=413 bgcolor=#d6d6d6
| 53413 ||  || — || July 13, 1999 || Socorro || LINEAR || — || align=right | 7.5 km || 
|-id=414 bgcolor=#d6d6d6
| 53414 ||  || — || July 14, 1999 || Socorro || LINEAR || — || align=right | 8.6 km || 
|-id=415 bgcolor=#d6d6d6
| 53415 ||  || — || July 14, 1999 || Socorro || LINEAR || EUP || align=right | 10 km || 
|-id=416 bgcolor=#d6d6d6
| 53416 ||  || — || July 14, 1999 || Socorro || LINEAR || — || align=right | 8.1 km || 
|-id=417 bgcolor=#fefefe
| 53417 ||  || — || July 14, 1999 || Socorro || LINEAR || H || align=right | 2.0 km || 
|-id=418 bgcolor=#C2FFFF
| 53418 ||  || — || August 13, 1999 || Anderson Mesa || LONEOS || L5 || align=right | 25 km || 
|-id=419 bgcolor=#C2FFFF
| 53419 ||  || — || August 13, 1999 || Anderson Mesa || LONEOS || L5 || align=right | 22 km || 
|-id=420 bgcolor=#d6d6d6
| 53420 ||  || — || September 5, 1999 || Catalina || CSS || EOS || align=right | 7.5 km || 
|-id=421 bgcolor=#fefefe
| 53421 ||  || — || September 7, 1999 || Socorro || LINEAR || H || align=right | 1.6 km || 
|-id=422 bgcolor=#fefefe
| 53422 ||  || — || September 8, 1999 || Socorro || LINEAR || H || align=right | 1.5 km || 
|-id=423 bgcolor=#d6d6d6
| 53423 ||  || — || September 8, 1999 || Catalina || CSS || — || align=right | 6.4 km || 
|-id=424 bgcolor=#fefefe
| 53424 ||  || — || September 24, 1999 || Socorro || LINEAR || H || align=right | 2.5 km || 
|-id=425 bgcolor=#fefefe
| 53425 ||  || — || September 29, 1999 || Višnjan Observatory || K. Korlević || — || align=right | 3.9 km || 
|-id=426 bgcolor=#FFC2E0
| 53426 ||  || — || September 28, 1999 || Socorro || LINEAR || APO +1kmPHA || align=right | 1.3 km || 
|-id=427 bgcolor=#fefefe
| 53427 ||  || — || September 29, 1999 || Socorro || LINEAR || H || align=right | 1.5 km || 
|-id=428 bgcolor=#fefefe
| 53428 ||  || — || October 2, 1999 || Fountain Hills || C. W. Juels || H || align=right | 1.6 km || 
|-id=429 bgcolor=#FFC2E0
| 53429 ||  || — || October 3, 1999 || Socorro || LINEAR || APOPHAcritical || align=right data-sort-value="0.59" | 590 m || 
|-id=430 bgcolor=#FFC2E0
| 53430 ||  || — || October 13, 1999 || Socorro || LINEAR || AMO +1km || align=right | 1.2 km || 
|-id=431 bgcolor=#FA8072
| 53431 ||  || — || October 31, 1999 || Socorro || LINEAR || H || align=right | 2.5 km || 
|-id=432 bgcolor=#FA8072
| 53432 ||  || — || October 19, 1999 || Socorro || LINEAR || Hmoon || align=right | 2.1 km || 
|-id=433 bgcolor=#fefefe
| 53433 ||  || — || November 9, 1999 || Oizumi || T. Kobayashi || H || align=right | 2.1 km || 
|-id=434 bgcolor=#E9E9E9
| 53434 ||  || — || November 13, 1999 || Oizumi || T. Kobayashi || — || align=right | 5.9 km || 
|-id=435 bgcolor=#FFC2E0
| 53435 ||  || — || November 9, 1999 || Catalina || CSS || AMO +1km || align=right | 4.1 km || 
|-id=436 bgcolor=#C2FFFF
| 53436 ||  || — || November 13, 1999 || Catalina || CSS || L4 || align=right | 28 km || 
|-id=437 bgcolor=#fefefe
| 53437 ||  || — || November 26, 1999 || Višnjan Observatory || K. Korlević || — || align=right | 2.3 km || 
|-id=438 bgcolor=#fefefe
| 53438 ||  || — || November 30, 1999 || Oizumi || T. Kobayashi || H || align=right | 2.8 km || 
|-id=439 bgcolor=#fefefe
| 53439 ||  || — || November 30, 1999 || Oizumi || T. Kobayashi || — || align=right | 4.4 km || 
|-id=440 bgcolor=#fefefe
| 53440 ||  || — || December 6, 1999 || Socorro || LINEAR || H || align=right | 2.2 km || 
|-id=441 bgcolor=#fefefe
| 53441 ||  || — || December 7, 1999 || Socorro || LINEAR || — || align=right | 1.5 km || 
|-id=442 bgcolor=#fefefe
| 53442 ||  || — || December 7, 1999 || Socorro || LINEAR || FLO || align=right | 2.2 km || 
|-id=443 bgcolor=#fefefe
| 53443 ||  || — || December 7, 1999 || Socorro || LINEAR || — || align=right | 2.6 km || 
|-id=444 bgcolor=#fefefe
| 53444 ||  || — || December 7, 1999 || Socorro || LINEAR || — || align=right | 2.2 km || 
|-id=445 bgcolor=#fefefe
| 53445 ||  || — || December 7, 1999 || Socorro || LINEAR || — || align=right | 7.0 km || 
|-id=446 bgcolor=#fefefe
| 53446 ||  || — || December 7, 1999 || Socorro || LINEAR || V || align=right | 2.0 km || 
|-id=447 bgcolor=#fefefe
| 53447 ||  || — || December 8, 1999 || Nachi-Katsuura || Y. Shimizu, T. Urata || — || align=right | 2.0 km || 
|-id=448 bgcolor=#fefefe
| 53448 ||  || — || December 11, 1999 || Oizumi || T. Kobayashi || — || align=right | 2.3 km || 
|-id=449 bgcolor=#C2FFFF
| 53449 ||  || — || December 12, 1999 || Socorro || LINEAR || L4 || align=right | 22 km || 
|-id=450 bgcolor=#fefefe
| 53450 ||  || — || December 12, 1999 || Socorro || LINEAR || — || align=right | 2.3 km || 
|-id=451 bgcolor=#fefefe
| 53451 ||  || — || December 5, 1999 || Socorro || LINEAR || H || align=right | 1.8 km || 
|-id=452 bgcolor=#fefefe
| 53452 ||  || — || December 5, 1999 || Socorro || LINEAR || H || align=right | 1.5 km || 
|-id=453 bgcolor=#fefefe
| 53453 ||  || — || December 12, 1999 || Socorro || LINEAR || H || align=right | 2.3 km || 
|-id=454 bgcolor=#fefefe
| 53454 ||  || — || December 13, 1999 || Socorro || LINEAR || H || align=right | 4.7 km || 
|-id=455 bgcolor=#fefefe
| 53455 ||  || — || December 2, 1999 || Kitt Peak || Spacewatch || V || align=right | 1.7 km || 
|-id=456 bgcolor=#fefefe
| 53456 ||  || — || December 12, 1999 || Socorro || LINEAR || H || align=right | 2.0 km || 
|-id=457 bgcolor=#fefefe
| 53457 ||  || — || December 14, 1999 || Socorro || LINEAR || H || align=right | 1.6 km || 
|-id=458 bgcolor=#fefefe
| 53458 ||  || — || December 7, 1999 || Socorro || LINEAR || — || align=right | 1.6 km || 
|-id=459 bgcolor=#fefefe
| 53459 ||  || — || December 8, 1999 || Socorro || LINEAR || — || align=right | 2.2 km || 
|-id=460 bgcolor=#fefefe
| 53460 ||  || — || December 10, 1999 || Socorro || LINEAR || — || align=right | 2.6 km || 
|-id=461 bgcolor=#fefefe
| 53461 ||  || — || December 10, 1999 || Socorro || LINEAR || — || align=right | 1.5 km || 
|-id=462 bgcolor=#fefefe
| 53462 ||  || — || December 10, 1999 || Socorro || LINEAR || — || align=right | 1.8 km || 
|-id=463 bgcolor=#fefefe
| 53463 ||  || — || December 12, 1999 || Socorro || LINEAR || — || align=right | 1.9 km || 
|-id=464 bgcolor=#E9E9E9
| 53464 ||  || — || December 12, 1999 || Socorro || LINEAR || — || align=right | 7.9 km || 
|-id=465 bgcolor=#fefefe
| 53465 ||  || — || December 15, 1999 || Socorro || LINEAR || — || align=right | 2.0 km || 
|-id=466 bgcolor=#d6d6d6
| 53466 ||  || — || December 7, 1999 || Anderson Mesa || LONEOS || ITH || align=right | 5.1 km || 
|-id=467 bgcolor=#fefefe
| 53467 ||  || — || January 2, 2000 || Kitt Peak || Spacewatch || V || align=right | 1.8 km || 
|-id=468 bgcolor=#fefefe
| 53468 Varros ||  ||  || January 2, 2000 || Gnosca || S. Sposetti || — || align=right | 1.7 km || 
|-id=469 bgcolor=#C2FFFF
| 53469 ||  || — || January 2, 2000 || Socorro || LINEAR || L4ERY || align=right | 18 km || 
|-id=470 bgcolor=#E9E9E9
| 53470 ||  || — || January 3, 2000 || Socorro || LINEAR || — || align=right | 4.0 km || 
|-id=471 bgcolor=#E9E9E9
| 53471 ||  || — || January 3, 2000 || Socorro || LINEAR || — || align=right | 4.8 km || 
|-id=472 bgcolor=#fefefe
| 53472 ||  || — || January 3, 2000 || Socorro || LINEAR || V || align=right | 1.8 km || 
|-id=473 bgcolor=#fefefe
| 53473 ||  || — || January 3, 2000 || Socorro || LINEAR || FLO || align=right | 1.7 km || 
|-id=474 bgcolor=#fefefe
| 53474 ||  || — || January 3, 2000 || Socorro || LINEAR || FLO || align=right | 2.5 km || 
|-id=475 bgcolor=#fefefe
| 53475 ||  || — || January 5, 2000 || Socorro || LINEAR || FLO || align=right | 1.4 km || 
|-id=476 bgcolor=#fefefe
| 53476 ||  || — || January 5, 2000 || Socorro || LINEAR || — || align=right | 1.7 km || 
|-id=477 bgcolor=#C2FFFF
| 53477 ||  || — || January 4, 2000 || Socorro || LINEAR || L4 || align=right | 20 km || 
|-id=478 bgcolor=#fefefe
| 53478 ||  || — || January 4, 2000 || Socorro || LINEAR || — || align=right | 4.3 km || 
|-id=479 bgcolor=#fefefe
| 53479 ||  || — || January 4, 2000 || Socorro || LINEAR || V || align=right | 2.1 km || 
|-id=480 bgcolor=#fefefe
| 53480 ||  || — || January 4, 2000 || Socorro || LINEAR || — || align=right | 2.3 km || 
|-id=481 bgcolor=#fefefe
| 53481 ||  || — || January 4, 2000 || Socorro || LINEAR || — || align=right | 1.9 km || 
|-id=482 bgcolor=#fefefe
| 53482 ||  || — || January 4, 2000 || Socorro || LINEAR || — || align=right | 2.5 km || 
|-id=483 bgcolor=#fefefe
| 53483 ||  || — || January 4, 2000 || Socorro || LINEAR || — || align=right | 3.3 km || 
|-id=484 bgcolor=#fefefe
| 53484 ||  || — || January 4, 2000 || Socorro || LINEAR || — || align=right | 2.7 km || 
|-id=485 bgcolor=#fefefe
| 53485 ||  || — || January 4, 2000 || Socorro || LINEAR || NYS || align=right | 1.9 km || 
|-id=486 bgcolor=#fefefe
| 53486 ||  || — || January 4, 2000 || Socorro || LINEAR || — || align=right | 7.1 km || 
|-id=487 bgcolor=#fefefe
| 53487 ||  || — || January 4, 2000 || Socorro || LINEAR || FLO || align=right | 2.0 km || 
|-id=488 bgcolor=#d6d6d6
| 53488 ||  || — || January 4, 2000 || Socorro || LINEAR || — || align=right | 5.8 km || 
|-id=489 bgcolor=#fefefe
| 53489 ||  || — || January 4, 2000 || Socorro || LINEAR || FLO || align=right | 3.2 km || 
|-id=490 bgcolor=#fefefe
| 53490 ||  || — || January 4, 2000 || Socorro || LINEAR || — || align=right | 2.3 km || 
|-id=491 bgcolor=#fefefe
| 53491 ||  || — || January 4, 2000 || Socorro || LINEAR || V || align=right | 1.9 km || 
|-id=492 bgcolor=#E9E9E9
| 53492 ||  || — || January 4, 2000 || Socorro || LINEAR || — || align=right | 3.9 km || 
|-id=493 bgcolor=#fefefe
| 53493 ||  || — || January 4, 2000 || Socorro || LINEAR || — || align=right | 2.5 km || 
|-id=494 bgcolor=#d6d6d6
| 53494 ||  || — || January 5, 2000 || Socorro || LINEAR || — || align=right | 12 km || 
|-id=495 bgcolor=#d6d6d6
| 53495 ||  || — || January 5, 2000 || Socorro || LINEAR || — || align=right | 8.7 km || 
|-id=496 bgcolor=#fefefe
| 53496 ||  || — || January 5, 2000 || Socorro || LINEAR || — || align=right | 3.6 km || 
|-id=497 bgcolor=#fefefe
| 53497 ||  || — || January 5, 2000 || Socorro || LINEAR || — || align=right | 1.9 km || 
|-id=498 bgcolor=#fefefe
| 53498 ||  || — || January 5, 2000 || Socorro || LINEAR || — || align=right | 1.7 km || 
|-id=499 bgcolor=#fefefe
| 53499 ||  || — || January 5, 2000 || Socorro || LINEAR || — || align=right | 2.1 km || 
|-id=500 bgcolor=#fefefe
| 53500 ||  || — || January 5, 2000 || Socorro || LINEAR || — || align=right | 2.5 km || 
|}

53501–53600 

|-bgcolor=#fefefe
| 53501 ||  || — || January 4, 2000 || Socorro || LINEAR || — || align=right | 2.7 km || 
|-id=502 bgcolor=#fefefe
| 53502 ||  || — || January 4, 2000 || Socorro || LINEAR || — || align=right | 3.7 km || 
|-id=503 bgcolor=#fefefe
| 53503 ||  || — || January 4, 2000 || Socorro || LINEAR || — || align=right | 3.5 km || 
|-id=504 bgcolor=#fefefe
| 53504 ||  || — || January 4, 2000 || Socorro || LINEAR || V || align=right | 2.4 km || 
|-id=505 bgcolor=#fefefe
| 53505 ||  || — || January 5, 2000 || Socorro || LINEAR || — || align=right | 3.0 km || 
|-id=506 bgcolor=#fefefe
| 53506 ||  || — || January 5, 2000 || Socorro || LINEAR || V || align=right | 1.5 km || 
|-id=507 bgcolor=#fefefe
| 53507 ||  || — || January 5, 2000 || Socorro || LINEAR || V || align=right | 2.3 km || 
|-id=508 bgcolor=#fefefe
| 53508 ||  || — || January 5, 2000 || Socorro || LINEAR || — || align=right | 2.0 km || 
|-id=509 bgcolor=#fefefe
| 53509 ||  || — || January 5, 2000 || Socorro || LINEAR || — || align=right | 1.6 km || 
|-id=510 bgcolor=#E9E9E9
| 53510 ||  || — || January 5, 2000 || Socorro || LINEAR || — || align=right | 2.7 km || 
|-id=511 bgcolor=#fefefe
| 53511 ||  || — || January 5, 2000 || Socorro || LINEAR || FLO || align=right | 2.9 km || 
|-id=512 bgcolor=#d6d6d6
| 53512 ||  || — || January 5, 2000 || Socorro || LINEAR || — || align=right | 10 km || 
|-id=513 bgcolor=#d6d6d6
| 53513 ||  || — || January 4, 2000 || Socorro || LINEAR || — || align=right | 7.8 km || 
|-id=514 bgcolor=#fefefe
| 53514 ||  || — || January 4, 2000 || Socorro || LINEAR || FLO || align=right | 2.0 km || 
|-id=515 bgcolor=#fefefe
| 53515 ||  || — || January 4, 2000 || Socorro || LINEAR || V || align=right | 2.3 km || 
|-id=516 bgcolor=#E9E9E9
| 53516 ||  || — || January 4, 2000 || Socorro || LINEAR || — || align=right | 6.3 km || 
|-id=517 bgcolor=#E9E9E9
| 53517 ||  || — || January 4, 2000 || Socorro || LINEAR || POS || align=right | 7.4 km || 
|-id=518 bgcolor=#fefefe
| 53518 ||  || — || January 4, 2000 || Socorro || LINEAR || — || align=right | 3.6 km || 
|-id=519 bgcolor=#fefefe
| 53519 ||  || — || January 5, 2000 || Socorro || LINEAR || — || align=right | 3.4 km || 
|-id=520 bgcolor=#fefefe
| 53520 ||  || — || January 5, 2000 || Socorro || LINEAR || FLO || align=right | 2.4 km || 
|-id=521 bgcolor=#fefefe
| 53521 ||  || — || January 5, 2000 || Socorro || LINEAR || — || align=right | 2.8 km || 
|-id=522 bgcolor=#fefefe
| 53522 ||  || — || January 7, 2000 || Socorro || LINEAR || H || align=right | 1.2 km || 
|-id=523 bgcolor=#fefefe
| 53523 ||  || — || January 8, 2000 || Socorro || LINEAR || FLOfast? || align=right | 2.6 km || 
|-id=524 bgcolor=#fefefe
| 53524 ||  || — || January 13, 2000 || Kitt Peak || Spacewatch || V || align=right | 1.5 km || 
|-id=525 bgcolor=#fefefe
| 53525 ||  || — || January 3, 2000 || Socorro || LINEAR || FLO || align=right | 2.7 km || 
|-id=526 bgcolor=#fefefe
| 53526 ||  || — || January 4, 2000 || Socorro || LINEAR || FLO || align=right | 1.7 km || 
|-id=527 bgcolor=#E9E9E9
| 53527 ||  || — || January 5, 2000 || Socorro || LINEAR || HNS || align=right | 4.5 km || 
|-id=528 bgcolor=#E9E9E9
| 53528 ||  || — || January 7, 2000 || Socorro || LINEAR || — || align=right | 4.2 km || 
|-id=529 bgcolor=#fefefe
| 53529 ||  || — || January 8, 2000 || Socorro || LINEAR || — || align=right | 2.1 km || 
|-id=530 bgcolor=#fefefe
| 53530 ||  || — || January 9, 2000 || Socorro || LINEAR || H || align=right | 2.2 km || 
|-id=531 bgcolor=#fefefe
| 53531 ||  || — || January 5, 2000 || Kitt Peak || Spacewatch || — || align=right | 2.7 km || 
|-id=532 bgcolor=#fefefe
| 53532 ||  || — || January 5, 2000 || Kitt Peak || Spacewatch || — || align=right | 2.1 km || 
|-id=533 bgcolor=#fefefe
| 53533 ||  || — || January 7, 2000 || Kitt Peak || Spacewatch || — || align=right | 2.8 km || 
|-id=534 bgcolor=#fefefe
| 53534 ||  || — || January 4, 2000 || Socorro || LINEAR || NYS || align=right | 2.2 km || 
|-id=535 bgcolor=#E9E9E9
| 53535 ||  || — || January 5, 2000 || Socorro || LINEAR || — || align=right | 4.4 km || 
|-id=536 bgcolor=#fefefe
| 53536 ||  || — || January 6, 2000 || Socorro || LINEAR || — || align=right | 2.6 km || 
|-id=537 bgcolor=#fefefe
| 53537 Zhangyun ||  ||  || January 6, 2000 || Anderson Mesa || LONEOS || SUL || align=right | 8.4 km || 
|-id=538 bgcolor=#fefefe
| 53538 ||  || — || January 6, 2000 || Anderson Mesa || LONEOS || FLO || align=right | 2.5 km || 
|-id=539 bgcolor=#fefefe
| 53539 ||  || — || January 7, 2000 || Socorro || LINEAR || — || align=right | 1.4 km || 
|-id=540 bgcolor=#fefefe
| 53540 ||  || — || January 6, 2000 || Socorro || LINEAR || V || align=right | 1.8 km || 
|-id=541 bgcolor=#fefefe
| 53541 ||  || — || January 7, 2000 || Kitt Peak || Spacewatch || — || align=right | 2.3 km || 
|-id=542 bgcolor=#fefefe
| 53542 ||  || — || January 28, 2000 || Socorro || LINEAR || — || align=right | 2.5 km || 
|-id=543 bgcolor=#fefefe
| 53543 ||  || — || January 26, 2000 || Višnjan Observatory || K. Korlević || NYS || align=right | 1.9 km || 
|-id=544 bgcolor=#fefefe
| 53544 ||  || — || January 27, 2000 || Višnjan Observatory || K. Korlević || NYS || align=right | 3.8 km || 
|-id=545 bgcolor=#E9E9E9
| 53545 ||  || — || January 27, 2000 || Socorro || LINEAR || — || align=right | 2.8 km || 
|-id=546 bgcolor=#E9E9E9
| 53546 ||  || — || January 27, 2000 || Socorro || LINEAR || 526 || align=right | 7.2 km || 
|-id=547 bgcolor=#fefefe
| 53547 ||  || — || January 29, 2000 || Socorro || LINEAR || V || align=right | 1.8 km || 
|-id=548 bgcolor=#fefefe
| 53548 ||  || — || January 28, 2000 || Uenohara || N. Kawasato || EUT || align=right | 1.9 km || 
|-id=549 bgcolor=#E9E9E9
| 53549 ||  || — || January 28, 2000 || Oizumi || T. Kobayashi || — || align=right | 6.6 km || 
|-id=550 bgcolor=#FFC2E0
| 53550 ||  || — || January 28, 2000 || Kitt Peak || Spacewatch || APOPHA || align=right data-sort-value="0.57" | 570 m || 
|-id=551 bgcolor=#fefefe
| 53551 ||  || — || January 29, 2000 || Socorro || LINEAR || — || align=right | 1.5 km || 
|-id=552 bgcolor=#fefefe
| 53552 ||  || — || January 29, 2000 || Kitt Peak || Spacewatch || — || align=right | 2.0 km || 
|-id=553 bgcolor=#fefefe
| 53553 ||  || — || February 2, 2000 || Oizumi || T. Kobayashi || — || align=right | 2.6 km || 
|-id=554 bgcolor=#fefefe
| 53554 ||  || — || February 2, 2000 || Gekko || T. Kagawa || — || align=right | 3.0 km || 
|-id=555 bgcolor=#fefefe
| 53555 ||  || — || February 2, 2000 || Socorro || LINEAR || FLO || align=right | 2.6 km || 
|-id=556 bgcolor=#fefefe
| 53556 ||  || — || February 2, 2000 || Socorro || LINEAR || — || align=right | 2.2 km || 
|-id=557 bgcolor=#fefefe
| 53557 ||  || — || February 2, 2000 || Socorro || LINEAR || FLO || align=right | 2.8 km || 
|-id=558 bgcolor=#fefefe
| 53558 ||  || — || February 2, 2000 || Socorro || LINEAR || NYS || align=right | 3.0 km || 
|-id=559 bgcolor=#fefefe
| 53559 ||  || — || February 2, 2000 || Socorro || LINEAR || — || align=right | 1.7 km || 
|-id=560 bgcolor=#fefefe
| 53560 ||  || — || February 2, 2000 || Socorro || LINEAR || — || align=right | 1.5 km || 
|-id=561 bgcolor=#fefefe
| 53561 ||  || — || February 2, 2000 || Socorro || LINEAR || — || align=right | 2.4 km || 
|-id=562 bgcolor=#fefefe
| 53562 ||  || — || February 2, 2000 || Socorro || LINEAR || V || align=right | 2.1 km || 
|-id=563 bgcolor=#fefefe
| 53563 ||  || — || February 2, 2000 || Socorro || LINEAR || FLO || align=right | 1.9 km || 
|-id=564 bgcolor=#fefefe
| 53564 ||  || — || February 2, 2000 || Socorro || LINEAR || — || align=right | 2.2 km || 
|-id=565 bgcolor=#fefefe
| 53565 ||  || — || February 2, 2000 || Socorro || LINEAR || MAS || align=right | 1.9 km || 
|-id=566 bgcolor=#fefefe
| 53566 ||  || — || February 2, 2000 || Socorro || LINEAR || — || align=right | 2.4 km || 
|-id=567 bgcolor=#fefefe
| 53567 ||  || — || February 2, 2000 || Socorro || LINEAR || V || align=right | 2.0 km || 
|-id=568 bgcolor=#E9E9E9
| 53568 ||  || — || February 4, 2000 || Višnjan Observatory || K. Korlević || EUN || align=right | 2.6 km || 
|-id=569 bgcolor=#fefefe
| 53569 ||  || — || February 2, 2000 || Socorro || LINEAR || — || align=right | 3.6 km || 
|-id=570 bgcolor=#fefefe
| 53570 ||  || — || February 2, 2000 || Socorro || LINEAR || — || align=right | 4.8 km || 
|-id=571 bgcolor=#fefefe
| 53571 ||  || — || February 2, 2000 || Socorro || LINEAR || — || align=right | 2.0 km || 
|-id=572 bgcolor=#fefefe
| 53572 ||  || — || February 3, 2000 || Socorro || LINEAR || — || align=right | 1.8 km || 
|-id=573 bgcolor=#d6d6d6
| 53573 ||  || — || February 3, 2000 || Socorro || LINEAR || — || align=right | 5.3 km || 
|-id=574 bgcolor=#fefefe
| 53574 ||  || — || February 7, 2000 || Prescott || P. G. Comba || — || align=right | 1.8 km || 
|-id=575 bgcolor=#fefefe
| 53575 ||  || — || February 2, 2000 || Socorro || LINEAR || V || align=right | 2.2 km || 
|-id=576 bgcolor=#fefefe
| 53576 ||  || — || February 2, 2000 || Socorro || LINEAR || FLO || align=right | 1.9 km || 
|-id=577 bgcolor=#fefefe
| 53577 ||  || — || February 2, 2000 || Socorro || LINEAR || ERI || align=right | 4.2 km || 
|-id=578 bgcolor=#fefefe
| 53578 ||  || — || February 2, 2000 || Socorro || LINEAR || FLO || align=right | 2.0 km || 
|-id=579 bgcolor=#fefefe
| 53579 ||  || — || February 2, 2000 || Socorro || LINEAR || — || align=right | 1.7 km || 
|-id=580 bgcolor=#fefefe
| 53580 ||  || — || February 2, 2000 || Socorro || LINEAR || V || align=right | 2.0 km || 
|-id=581 bgcolor=#fefefe
| 53581 ||  || — || February 2, 2000 || Socorro || LINEAR || — || align=right | 2.6 km || 
|-id=582 bgcolor=#fefefe
| 53582 ||  || — || February 2, 2000 || Socorro || LINEAR || V || align=right | 1.7 km || 
|-id=583 bgcolor=#fefefe
| 53583 ||  || — || February 2, 2000 || Socorro || LINEAR || — || align=right | 1.6 km || 
|-id=584 bgcolor=#fefefe
| 53584 ||  || — || February 2, 2000 || Socorro || LINEAR || — || align=right | 2.9 km || 
|-id=585 bgcolor=#fefefe
| 53585 ||  || — || February 2, 2000 || Socorro || LINEAR || — || align=right | 4.4 km || 
|-id=586 bgcolor=#fefefe
| 53586 ||  || — || February 2, 2000 || Socorro || LINEAR || — || align=right | 2.3 km || 
|-id=587 bgcolor=#E9E9E9
| 53587 ||  || — || February 2, 2000 || Socorro || LINEAR || — || align=right | 3.7 km || 
|-id=588 bgcolor=#E9E9E9
| 53588 ||  || — || February 2, 2000 || Socorro || LINEAR || BRU || align=right | 7.3 km || 
|-id=589 bgcolor=#fefefe
| 53589 ||  || — || February 2, 2000 || Socorro || LINEAR || FLO || align=right | 2.8 km || 
|-id=590 bgcolor=#fefefe
| 53590 ||  || — || February 2, 2000 || Socorro || LINEAR || V || align=right | 2.1 km || 
|-id=591 bgcolor=#fefefe
| 53591 ||  || — || February 4, 2000 || Socorro || LINEAR || — || align=right | 3.3 km || 
|-id=592 bgcolor=#fefefe
| 53592 ||  || — || February 4, 2000 || Socorro || LINEAR || — || align=right | 1.9 km || 
|-id=593 bgcolor=#fefefe
| 53593 ||  || — || February 5, 2000 || Socorro || LINEAR || — || align=right | 2.9 km || 
|-id=594 bgcolor=#fefefe
| 53594 ||  || — || February 2, 2000 || Socorro || LINEAR || FLO || align=right | 2.1 km || 
|-id=595 bgcolor=#fefefe
| 53595 ||  || — || February 2, 2000 || Socorro || LINEAR || — || align=right | 1.9 km || 
|-id=596 bgcolor=#fefefe
| 53596 ||  || — || February 2, 2000 || Socorro || LINEAR || — || align=right | 2.1 km || 
|-id=597 bgcolor=#fefefe
| 53597 ||  || — || February 2, 2000 || Socorro || LINEAR || — || align=right | 2.0 km || 
|-id=598 bgcolor=#fefefe
| 53598 ||  || — || February 6, 2000 || Socorro || LINEAR || — || align=right | 2.0 km || 
|-id=599 bgcolor=#E9E9E9
| 53599 ||  || — || February 7, 2000 || Socorro || LINEAR || — || align=right | 3.9 km || 
|-id=600 bgcolor=#fefefe
| 53600 ||  || — || February 7, 2000 || Socorro || LINEAR || — || align=right | 2.3 km || 
|}

53601–53700 

|-bgcolor=#fefefe
| 53601 ||  || — || February 4, 2000 || Višnjan Observatory || K. Korlević || — || align=right | 1.6 km || 
|-id=602 bgcolor=#fefefe
| 53602 ||  || — || February 6, 2000 || Višnjan Observatory || K. Korlević || — || align=right | 3.0 km || 
|-id=603 bgcolor=#fefefe
| 53603 ||  || — || February 3, 2000 || Socorro || LINEAR || — || align=right | 2.2 km || 
|-id=604 bgcolor=#fefefe
| 53604 ||  || — || February 4, 2000 || Socorro || LINEAR || — || align=right | 2.2 km || 
|-id=605 bgcolor=#E9E9E9
| 53605 ||  || — || February 10, 2000 || Višnjan Observatory || K. Korlević || — || align=right | 5.0 km || 
|-id=606 bgcolor=#fefefe
| 53606 ||  || — || February 4, 2000 || Socorro || LINEAR || — || align=right | 1.9 km || 
|-id=607 bgcolor=#fefefe
| 53607 ||  || — || February 4, 2000 || Socorro || LINEAR || — || align=right | 1.8 km || 
|-id=608 bgcolor=#fefefe
| 53608 ||  || — || February 4, 2000 || Socorro || LINEAR || — || align=right | 3.2 km || 
|-id=609 bgcolor=#fefefe
| 53609 ||  || — || February 4, 2000 || Socorro || LINEAR || — || align=right | 2.6 km || 
|-id=610 bgcolor=#E9E9E9
| 53610 ||  || — || February 4, 2000 || Socorro || LINEAR || — || align=right | 3.9 km || 
|-id=611 bgcolor=#fefefe
| 53611 ||  || — || February 4, 2000 || Socorro || LINEAR || NYS || align=right | 1.8 km || 
|-id=612 bgcolor=#fefefe
| 53612 ||  || — || February 4, 2000 || Socorro || LINEAR || — || align=right | 1.8 km || 
|-id=613 bgcolor=#fefefe
| 53613 ||  || — || February 4, 2000 || Socorro || LINEAR || — || align=right | 2.0 km || 
|-id=614 bgcolor=#fefefe
| 53614 ||  || — || February 4, 2000 || Socorro || LINEAR || — || align=right | 2.1 km || 
|-id=615 bgcolor=#fefefe
| 53615 ||  || — || February 4, 2000 || Socorro || LINEAR || NYS || align=right | 2.3 km || 
|-id=616 bgcolor=#fefefe
| 53616 ||  || — || February 4, 2000 || Socorro || LINEAR || FLO || align=right | 1.4 km || 
|-id=617 bgcolor=#fefefe
| 53617 ||  || — || February 4, 2000 || Socorro || LINEAR || FLO || align=right | 1.6 km || 
|-id=618 bgcolor=#fefefe
| 53618 ||  || — || February 6, 2000 || Socorro || LINEAR || — || align=right | 2.3 km || 
|-id=619 bgcolor=#fefefe
| 53619 ||  || — || February 6, 2000 || Socorro || LINEAR || — || align=right | 3.6 km || 
|-id=620 bgcolor=#fefefe
| 53620 ||  || — || February 6, 2000 || Socorro || LINEAR || — || align=right | 3.1 km || 
|-id=621 bgcolor=#fefefe
| 53621 ||  || — || February 6, 2000 || Socorro || LINEAR || — || align=right | 2.1 km || 
|-id=622 bgcolor=#d6d6d6
| 53622 ||  || — || February 8, 2000 || Socorro || LINEAR || — || align=right | 6.3 km || 
|-id=623 bgcolor=#fefefe
| 53623 ||  || — || February 8, 2000 || Socorro || LINEAR || NYS || align=right | 1.9 km || 
|-id=624 bgcolor=#E9E9E9
| 53624 ||  || — || February 8, 2000 || Kitt Peak || Spacewatch || — || align=right | 2.2 km || 
|-id=625 bgcolor=#fefefe
| 53625 ||  || — || February 8, 2000 || Socorro || LINEAR || — || align=right | 2.1 km || 
|-id=626 bgcolor=#fefefe
| 53626 ||  || — || February 11, 2000 || Višnjan Observatory || K. Korlević || — || align=right | 1.5 km || 
|-id=627 bgcolor=#E9E9E9
| 53627 ||  || — || February 8, 2000 || Kitt Peak || Spacewatch || — || align=right | 3.1 km || 
|-id=628 bgcolor=#fefefe
| 53628 ||  || — || February 3, 2000 || Uccle || T. Pauwels || — || align=right | 3.1 km || 
|-id=629 bgcolor=#fefefe
| 53629 Andrewpotter ||  ||  || February 7, 2000 || Catalina || CSS || — || align=right | 1.7 km || 
|-id=630 bgcolor=#fefefe
| 53630 ||  || — || February 3, 2000 || Socorro || LINEAR || V || align=right | 2.3 km || 
|-id=631 bgcolor=#fefefe
| 53631 ||  || — || February 6, 2000 || Socorro || LINEAR || — || align=right | 2.4 km || 
|-id=632 bgcolor=#fefefe
| 53632 ||  || — || February 3, 2000 || Socorro || LINEAR || V || align=right | 1.7 km || 
|-id=633 bgcolor=#E9E9E9
| 53633 || 2000 DQ || — || February 24, 2000 || Oizumi || T. Kobayashi || — || align=right | 4.3 km || 
|-id=634 bgcolor=#fefefe
| 53634 ||  || — || February 26, 2000 || Rock Finder || W. K. Y. Yeung || FLO || align=right | 3.3 km || 
|-id=635 bgcolor=#fefefe
| 53635 ||  || — || February 28, 2000 || Socorro || LINEAR || FLO || align=right | 2.0 km || 
|-id=636 bgcolor=#fefefe
| 53636 ||  || — || February 26, 2000 || Kitt Peak || Spacewatch || NYS || align=right | 2.2 km || 
|-id=637 bgcolor=#fefefe
| 53637 ||  || — || February 27, 2000 || Kitt Peak || Spacewatch || — || align=right | 1.3 km || 
|-id=638 bgcolor=#fefefe
| 53638 ||  || — || February 27, 2000 || Kitt Peak || Spacewatch || — || align=right | 2.5 km || 
|-id=639 bgcolor=#fefefe
| 53639 ||  || — || February 28, 2000 || Kitt Peak || Spacewatch || — || align=right | 3.3 km || 
|-id=640 bgcolor=#fefefe
| 53640 Marché ||  ||  || February 26, 2000 || Catalina || CSS || — || align=right | 2.0 km || 
|-id=641 bgcolor=#fefefe
| 53641 ||  || — || February 28, 2000 || Višnjan Observatory || K. Korlević || FLO || align=right | 3.1 km || 
|-id=642 bgcolor=#E9E9E9
| 53642 ||  || — || February 28, 2000 || Socorro || LINEAR || — || align=right | 2.2 km || 
|-id=643 bgcolor=#fefefe
| 53643 ||  || — || February 28, 2000 || Socorro || LINEAR || — || align=right | 2.1 km || 
|-id=644 bgcolor=#fefefe
| 53644 ||  || — || February 29, 2000 || Socorro || LINEAR || — || align=right | 2.0 km || 
|-id=645 bgcolor=#fefefe
| 53645 ||  || — || February 29, 2000 || Socorro || LINEAR || — || align=right | 2.3 km || 
|-id=646 bgcolor=#fefefe
| 53646 ||  || — || February 29, 2000 || Socorro || LINEAR || FLO || align=right | 2.1 km || 
|-id=647 bgcolor=#fefefe
| 53647 ||  || — || February 29, 2000 || Socorro || LINEAR || NYS || align=right | 2.2 km || 
|-id=648 bgcolor=#fefefe
| 53648 ||  || — || February 29, 2000 || Socorro || LINEAR || — || align=right | 1.7 km || 
|-id=649 bgcolor=#fefefe
| 53649 ||  || — || February 29, 2000 || Socorro || LINEAR || NYS || align=right | 1.5 km || 
|-id=650 bgcolor=#fefefe
| 53650 ||  || — || February 29, 2000 || Socorro || LINEAR || V || align=right | 1.9 km || 
|-id=651 bgcolor=#E9E9E9
| 53651 ||  || — || February 29, 2000 || Socorro || LINEAR || — || align=right | 2.4 km || 
|-id=652 bgcolor=#fefefe
| 53652 ||  || — || February 29, 2000 || Socorro || LINEAR || — || align=right | 1.7 km || 
|-id=653 bgcolor=#fefefe
| 53653 ||  || — || February 29, 2000 || Socorro || LINEAR || NYS || align=right | 2.3 km || 
|-id=654 bgcolor=#E9E9E9
| 53654 ||  || — || February 29, 2000 || Socorro || LINEAR || — || align=right | 3.8 km || 
|-id=655 bgcolor=#E9E9E9
| 53655 ||  || — || February 29, 2000 || Socorro || LINEAR || — || align=right | 6.1 km || 
|-id=656 bgcolor=#fefefe
| 53656 ||  || — || February 29, 2000 || Socorro || LINEAR || — || align=right | 2.0 km || 
|-id=657 bgcolor=#fefefe
| 53657 ||  || — || February 29, 2000 || Socorro || LINEAR || — || align=right | 1.6 km || 
|-id=658 bgcolor=#fefefe
| 53658 ||  || — || February 29, 2000 || Socorro || LINEAR || — || align=right | 2.7 km || 
|-id=659 bgcolor=#E9E9E9
| 53659 ||  || — || February 29, 2000 || Socorro || LINEAR || — || align=right | 4.3 km || 
|-id=660 bgcolor=#E9E9E9
| 53660 ||  || — || February 29, 2000 || Socorro || LINEAR || — || align=right | 2.7 km || 
|-id=661 bgcolor=#fefefe
| 53661 ||  || — || February 29, 2000 || Socorro || LINEAR || — || align=right | 3.0 km || 
|-id=662 bgcolor=#fefefe
| 53662 ||  || — || February 29, 2000 || Socorro || LINEAR || — || align=right | 2.4 km || 
|-id=663 bgcolor=#fefefe
| 53663 ||  || — || February 29, 2000 || Socorro || LINEAR || FLO || align=right | 1.5 km || 
|-id=664 bgcolor=#fefefe
| 53664 ||  || — || February 29, 2000 || Socorro || LINEAR || — || align=right | 2.0 km || 
|-id=665 bgcolor=#fefefe
| 53665 ||  || — || February 29, 2000 || Socorro || LINEAR || — || align=right | 2.2 km || 
|-id=666 bgcolor=#fefefe
| 53666 ||  || — || February 29, 2000 || Socorro || LINEAR || FLO || align=right | 1.7 km || 
|-id=667 bgcolor=#fefefe
| 53667 ||  || — || February 29, 2000 || Socorro || LINEAR || — || align=right | 1.7 km || 
|-id=668 bgcolor=#E9E9E9
| 53668 ||  || — || February 29, 2000 || Socorro || LINEAR || MIS || align=right | 5.5 km || 
|-id=669 bgcolor=#fefefe
| 53669 ||  || — || February 29, 2000 || Socorro || LINEAR || FLO || align=right | 1.6 km || 
|-id=670 bgcolor=#fefefe
| 53670 ||  || — || February 29, 2000 || Socorro || LINEAR || — || align=right | 1.4 km || 
|-id=671 bgcolor=#fefefe
| 53671 ||  || — || February 29, 2000 || Socorro || LINEAR || — || align=right | 5.6 km || 
|-id=672 bgcolor=#fefefe
| 53672 ||  || — || February 29, 2000 || Socorro || LINEAR || — || align=right | 2.4 km || 
|-id=673 bgcolor=#fefefe
| 53673 ||  || — || February 29, 2000 || Socorro || LINEAR || NYS || align=right | 2.3 km || 
|-id=674 bgcolor=#E9E9E9
| 53674 ||  || — || February 29, 2000 || Socorro || LINEAR || — || align=right | 2.5 km || 
|-id=675 bgcolor=#fefefe
| 53675 ||  || — || February 29, 2000 || Socorro || LINEAR || — || align=right | 2.3 km || 
|-id=676 bgcolor=#fefefe
| 53676 ||  || — || February 29, 2000 || Socorro || LINEAR || FLO || align=right | 1.2 km || 
|-id=677 bgcolor=#fefefe
| 53677 ||  || — || February 29, 2000 || Socorro || LINEAR || NYS || align=right | 1.4 km || 
|-id=678 bgcolor=#E9E9E9
| 53678 ||  || — || February 29, 2000 || Socorro || LINEAR || — || align=right | 2.8 km || 
|-id=679 bgcolor=#fefefe
| 53679 ||  || — || February 29, 2000 || Socorro || LINEAR || — || align=right | 1.5 km || 
|-id=680 bgcolor=#fefefe
| 53680 ||  || — || February 29, 2000 || Socorro || LINEAR || V || align=right | 1.2 km || 
|-id=681 bgcolor=#E9E9E9
| 53681 ||  || — || February 29, 2000 || Socorro || LINEAR || — || align=right | 4.7 km || 
|-id=682 bgcolor=#fefefe
| 53682 ||  || — || February 29, 2000 || Socorro || LINEAR || NYS || align=right | 3.5 km || 
|-id=683 bgcolor=#d6d6d6
| 53683 ||  || — || February 29, 2000 || Socorro || LINEAR || — || align=right | 5.8 km || 
|-id=684 bgcolor=#fefefe
| 53684 ||  || — || February 29, 2000 || Socorro || LINEAR || — || align=right | 3.0 km || 
|-id=685 bgcolor=#fefefe
| 53685 ||  || — || February 29, 2000 || Socorro || LINEAR || NYS || align=right | 2.5 km || 
|-id=686 bgcolor=#fefefe
| 53686 ||  || — || February 28, 2000 || Socorro || LINEAR || — || align=right | 2.0 km || 
|-id=687 bgcolor=#E9E9E9
| 53687 ||  || — || February 28, 2000 || Socorro || LINEAR || — || align=right | 2.3 km || 
|-id=688 bgcolor=#fefefe
| 53688 ||  || — || February 28, 2000 || Socorro || LINEAR || FLO || align=right | 2.3 km || 
|-id=689 bgcolor=#fefefe
| 53689 ||  || — || February 28, 2000 || Socorro || LINEAR || — || align=right | 2.0 km || 
|-id=690 bgcolor=#d6d6d6
| 53690 ||  || — || February 28, 2000 || Socorro || LINEAR || — || align=right | 2.8 km || 
|-id=691 bgcolor=#fefefe
| 53691 ||  || — || February 28, 2000 || Socorro || LINEAR || — || align=right | 2.4 km || 
|-id=692 bgcolor=#fefefe
| 53692 ||  || — || February 29, 2000 || Socorro || LINEAR || V || align=right | 1.9 km || 
|-id=693 bgcolor=#fefefe
| 53693 ||  || — || February 29, 2000 || Socorro || LINEAR || FLO || align=right | 2.3 km || 
|-id=694 bgcolor=#E9E9E9
| 53694 ||  || — || February 29, 2000 || Socorro || LINEAR || — || align=right | 3.0 km || 
|-id=695 bgcolor=#fefefe
| 53695 ||  || — || February 29, 2000 || Socorro || LINEAR || FLO || align=right | 2.2 km || 
|-id=696 bgcolor=#fefefe
| 53696 ||  || — || February 29, 2000 || Socorro || LINEAR || — || align=right | 2.8 km || 
|-id=697 bgcolor=#fefefe
| 53697 ||  || — || February 29, 2000 || Socorro || LINEAR || — || align=right | 2.1 km || 
|-id=698 bgcolor=#fefefe
| 53698 ||  || — || February 28, 2000 || Socorro || LINEAR || V || align=right | 1.5 km || 
|-id=699 bgcolor=#fefefe
| 53699 ||  || — || February 28, 2000 || Socorro || LINEAR || NYS || align=right | 1.9 km || 
|-id=700 bgcolor=#fefefe
| 53700 ||  || — || February 28, 2000 || Socorro || LINEAR || — || align=right | 1.6 km || 
|}

53701–53800 

|-bgcolor=#fefefe
| 53701 ||  || — || February 29, 2000 || Socorro || LINEAR || — || align=right | 1.9 km || 
|-id=702 bgcolor=#fefefe
| 53702 ||  || — || February 29, 2000 || Socorro || LINEAR || — || align=right | 2.9 km || 
|-id=703 bgcolor=#fefefe
| 53703 ||  || — || February 29, 2000 || Socorro || LINEAR || V || align=right | 2.4 km || 
|-id=704 bgcolor=#fefefe
| 53704 ||  || — || February 29, 2000 || Socorro || LINEAR || V || align=right | 1.6 km || 
|-id=705 bgcolor=#fefefe
| 53705 ||  || — || February 29, 2000 || Socorro || LINEAR || FLO || align=right | 1.9 km || 
|-id=706 bgcolor=#fefefe
| 53706 ||  || — || February 29, 2000 || Socorro || LINEAR || — || align=right | 2.2 km || 
|-id=707 bgcolor=#E9E9E9
| 53707 ||  || — || February 29, 2000 || Socorro || LINEAR || BRG || align=right | 4.8 km || 
|-id=708 bgcolor=#fefefe
| 53708 ||  || — || February 29, 2000 || Socorro || LINEAR || — || align=right | 1.8 km || 
|-id=709 bgcolor=#fefefe
| 53709 ||  || — || February 29, 2000 || Socorro || LINEAR || — || align=right | 2.0 km || 
|-id=710 bgcolor=#fefefe
| 53710 ||  || — || February 28, 2000 || Socorro || LINEAR || — || align=right | 1.4 km || 
|-id=711 bgcolor=#fefefe
| 53711 ||  || — || February 29, 2000 || Socorro || LINEAR || NYS || align=right | 1.8 km || 
|-id=712 bgcolor=#E9E9E9
| 53712 ||  || — || February 29, 2000 || Socorro || LINEAR || — || align=right | 4.8 km || 
|-id=713 bgcolor=#fefefe
| 53713 ||  || — || February 29, 2000 || Socorro || LINEAR || — || align=right | 1.2 km || 
|-id=714 bgcolor=#fefefe
| 53714 || 2000 EY || — || March 5, 2000 || Višnjan Observatory || K. Korlević || — || align=right | 3.3 km || 
|-id=715 bgcolor=#fefefe
| 53715 ||  || — || March 3, 2000 || Socorro || LINEAR || — || align=right | 2.9 km || 
|-id=716 bgcolor=#fefefe
| 53716 ||  || — || March 2, 2000 || Višnjan Observatory || K. Korlević || NYS || align=right | 4.4 km || 
|-id=717 bgcolor=#fefefe
| 53717 ||  || — || March 3, 2000 || Socorro || LINEAR || — || align=right | 1.7 km || 
|-id=718 bgcolor=#fefefe
| 53718 ||  || — || March 3, 2000 || Socorro || LINEAR || NYS || align=right | 1.5 km || 
|-id=719 bgcolor=#fefefe
| 53719 ||  || — || March 5, 2000 || Socorro || LINEAR || V || align=right | 1.9 km || 
|-id=720 bgcolor=#fefefe
| 53720 ||  || — || March 8, 2000 || Kitt Peak || Spacewatch || FLO || align=right | 1.5 km || 
|-id=721 bgcolor=#fefefe
| 53721 ||  || — || March 8, 2000 || Kitt Peak || Spacewatch || MAS || align=right | 1.7 km || 
|-id=722 bgcolor=#fefefe
| 53722 ||  || — || March 4, 2000 || Socorro || LINEAR || V || align=right | 1.5 km || 
|-id=723 bgcolor=#fefefe
| 53723 ||  || — || March 5, 2000 || Socorro || LINEAR || V || align=right | 1.8 km || 
|-id=724 bgcolor=#fefefe
| 53724 ||  || — || March 5, 2000 || Socorro || LINEAR || — || align=right | 1.6 km || 
|-id=725 bgcolor=#fefefe
| 53725 ||  || — || March 5, 2000 || Socorro || LINEAR || NYS || align=right | 2.4 km || 
|-id=726 bgcolor=#fefefe
| 53726 ||  || — || March 5, 2000 || Socorro || LINEAR || — || align=right | 2.4 km || 
|-id=727 bgcolor=#E9E9E9
| 53727 ||  || — || March 5, 2000 || Socorro || LINEAR || — || align=right | 5.5 km || 
|-id=728 bgcolor=#fefefe
| 53728 ||  || — || March 8, 2000 || Socorro || LINEAR || — || align=right | 2.5 km || 
|-id=729 bgcolor=#fefefe
| 53729 ||  || — || March 8, 2000 || Socorro || LINEAR || — || align=right | 1.8 km || 
|-id=730 bgcolor=#fefefe
| 53730 ||  || — || March 8, 2000 || Socorro || LINEAR || NYS || align=right | 3.6 km || 
|-id=731 bgcolor=#fefefe
| 53731 ||  || — || March 8, 2000 || Socorro || LINEAR || — || align=right | 3.1 km || 
|-id=732 bgcolor=#fefefe
| 53732 ||  || — || March 8, 2000 || Socorro || LINEAR || MAS || align=right | 1.6 km || 
|-id=733 bgcolor=#fefefe
| 53733 ||  || — || March 9, 2000 || Socorro || LINEAR || — || align=right | 1.7 km || 
|-id=734 bgcolor=#fefefe
| 53734 ||  || — || March 9, 2000 || Socorro || LINEAR || V || align=right | 2.7 km || 
|-id=735 bgcolor=#E9E9E9
| 53735 ||  || — || March 9, 2000 || Socorro || LINEAR || — || align=right | 3.2 km || 
|-id=736 bgcolor=#fefefe
| 53736 ||  || — || March 9, 2000 || Socorro || LINEAR || V || align=right | 1.7 km || 
|-id=737 bgcolor=#fefefe
| 53737 ||  || — || March 9, 2000 || Socorro || LINEAR || MAS || align=right | 2.4 km || 
|-id=738 bgcolor=#fefefe
| 53738 ||  || — || March 9, 2000 || Socorro || LINEAR || — || align=right | 1.8 km || 
|-id=739 bgcolor=#fefefe
| 53739 ||  || — || March 9, 2000 || Socorro || LINEAR || — || align=right | 2.3 km || 
|-id=740 bgcolor=#E9E9E9
| 53740 ||  || — || March 10, 2000 || Prescott || P. G. Comba || — || align=right | 5.6 km || 
|-id=741 bgcolor=#fefefe
| 53741 ||  || — || March 10, 2000 || Prescott || P. G. Comba || FLO || align=right | 1.4 km || 
|-id=742 bgcolor=#fefefe
| 53742 ||  || — || March 10, 2000 || Kitt Peak || Spacewatch || V || align=right | 2.7 km || 
|-id=743 bgcolor=#fefefe
| 53743 ||  || — || March 5, 2000 || Socorro || LINEAR || V || align=right | 1.5 km || 
|-id=744 bgcolor=#E9E9E9
| 53744 ||  || — || March 8, 2000 || Socorro || LINEAR || — || align=right | 3.9 km || 
|-id=745 bgcolor=#fefefe
| 53745 ||  || — || March 8, 2000 || Socorro || LINEAR || MAS || align=right | 2.0 km || 
|-id=746 bgcolor=#fefefe
| 53746 ||  || — || March 8, 2000 || Socorro || LINEAR || MAS || align=right | 1.5 km || 
|-id=747 bgcolor=#fefefe
| 53747 ||  || — || March 8, 2000 || Socorro || LINEAR || — || align=right | 1.7 km || 
|-id=748 bgcolor=#fefefe
| 53748 ||  || — || March 8, 2000 || Socorro || LINEAR || — || align=right | 2.2 km || 
|-id=749 bgcolor=#E9E9E9
| 53749 ||  || — || March 8, 2000 || Socorro || LINEAR || GEF || align=right | 3.2 km || 
|-id=750 bgcolor=#fefefe
| 53750 ||  || — || March 10, 2000 || Socorro || LINEAR || — || align=right | 1.4 km || 
|-id=751 bgcolor=#fefefe
| 53751 ||  || — || March 10, 2000 || Socorro || LINEAR || — || align=right | 1.7 km || 
|-id=752 bgcolor=#fefefe
| 53752 ||  || — || March 10, 2000 || Socorro || LINEAR || NYS || align=right | 2.0 km || 
|-id=753 bgcolor=#fefefe
| 53753 ||  || — || March 10, 2000 || Socorro || LINEAR || — || align=right | 3.6 km || 
|-id=754 bgcolor=#fefefe
| 53754 ||  || — || March 10, 2000 || Socorro || LINEAR || V || align=right | 1.7 km || 
|-id=755 bgcolor=#fefefe
| 53755 ||  || — || March 10, 2000 || Socorro || LINEAR || NYS || align=right | 3.9 km || 
|-id=756 bgcolor=#E9E9E9
| 53756 ||  || — || March 10, 2000 || Socorro || LINEAR || — || align=right | 3.0 km || 
|-id=757 bgcolor=#fefefe
| 53757 ||  || — || March 10, 2000 || Kitt Peak || Spacewatch || — || align=right | 4.2 km || 
|-id=758 bgcolor=#fefefe
| 53758 ||  || — || March 5, 2000 || Socorro || LINEAR || — || align=right | 2.9 km || 
|-id=759 bgcolor=#fefefe
| 53759 ||  || — || March 5, 2000 || Socorro || LINEAR || — || align=right | 2.1 km || 
|-id=760 bgcolor=#fefefe
| 53760 ||  || — || March 5, 2000 || Socorro || LINEAR || FLO || align=right | 2.0 km || 
|-id=761 bgcolor=#fefefe
| 53761 ||  || — || March 5, 2000 || Socorro || LINEAR || — || align=right | 1.8 km || 
|-id=762 bgcolor=#fefefe
| 53762 ||  || — || March 5, 2000 || Socorro || LINEAR || V || align=right | 1.8 km || 
|-id=763 bgcolor=#fefefe
| 53763 ||  || — || March 5, 2000 || Socorro || LINEAR || NYS || align=right | 1.7 km || 
|-id=764 bgcolor=#fefefe
| 53764 ||  || — || March 5, 2000 || Socorro || LINEAR || — || align=right | 5.5 km || 
|-id=765 bgcolor=#E9E9E9
| 53765 ||  || — || March 5, 2000 || Socorro || LINEAR || EUN || align=right | 3.4 km || 
|-id=766 bgcolor=#fefefe
| 53766 ||  || — || March 5, 2000 || Socorro || LINEAR || — || align=right | 2.5 km || 
|-id=767 bgcolor=#E9E9E9
| 53767 ||  || — || March 8, 2000 || Socorro || LINEAR || — || align=right | 6.2 km || 
|-id=768 bgcolor=#fefefe
| 53768 ||  || — || March 8, 2000 || Socorro || LINEAR || — || align=right | 4.4 km || 
|-id=769 bgcolor=#fefefe
| 53769 ||  || — || March 8, 2000 || Socorro || LINEAR || FLO || align=right | 1.8 km || 
|-id=770 bgcolor=#fefefe
| 53770 ||  || — || March 8, 2000 || Socorro || LINEAR || NYS || align=right | 2.0 km || 
|-id=771 bgcolor=#fefefe
| 53771 ||  || — || March 8, 2000 || Socorro || LINEAR || — || align=right | 3.5 km || 
|-id=772 bgcolor=#fefefe
| 53772 ||  || — || March 8, 2000 || Socorro || LINEAR || — || align=right | 2.3 km || 
|-id=773 bgcolor=#fefefe
| 53773 ||  || — || March 9, 2000 || Socorro || LINEAR || V || align=right | 2.3 km || 
|-id=774 bgcolor=#E9E9E9
| 53774 ||  || — || March 9, 2000 || Socorro || LINEAR || — || align=right | 2.9 km || 
|-id=775 bgcolor=#fefefe
| 53775 ||  || — || March 9, 2000 || Socorro || LINEAR || — || align=right | 1.8 km || 
|-id=776 bgcolor=#E9E9E9
| 53776 ||  || — || March 9, 2000 || Socorro || LINEAR || — || align=right | 3.9 km || 
|-id=777 bgcolor=#fefefe
| 53777 ||  || — || March 9, 2000 || Socorro || LINEAR || — || align=right | 3.3 km || 
|-id=778 bgcolor=#fefefe
| 53778 ||  || — || March 9, 2000 || Socorro || LINEAR || — || align=right | 2.7 km || 
|-id=779 bgcolor=#E9E9E9
| 53779 ||  || — || March 9, 2000 || Socorro || LINEAR || — || align=right | 2.9 km || 
|-id=780 bgcolor=#E9E9E9
| 53780 ||  || — || March 9, 2000 || Socorro || LINEAR || EUN || align=right | 3.2 km || 
|-id=781 bgcolor=#fefefe
| 53781 ||  || — || March 9, 2000 || Socorro || LINEAR || ERI || align=right | 4.9 km || 
|-id=782 bgcolor=#fefefe
| 53782 ||  || — || March 9, 2000 || Socorro || LINEAR || FLO || align=right | 2.7 km || 
|-id=783 bgcolor=#E9E9E9
| 53783 ||  || — || March 9, 2000 || Socorro || LINEAR || — || align=right | 3.2 km || 
|-id=784 bgcolor=#fefefe
| 53784 ||  || — || March 10, 2000 || Socorro || LINEAR || V || align=right | 2.0 km || 
|-id=785 bgcolor=#fefefe
| 53785 ||  || — || March 10, 2000 || Socorro || LINEAR || V || align=right | 2.3 km || 
|-id=786 bgcolor=#fefefe
| 53786 ||  || — || March 10, 2000 || Socorro || LINEAR || — || align=right | 3.9 km || 
|-id=787 bgcolor=#fefefe
| 53787 ||  || — || March 14, 2000 || Kitt Peak || Spacewatch || — || align=right | 2.5 km || 
|-id=788 bgcolor=#fefefe
| 53788 ||  || — || March 14, 2000 || Socorro || LINEAR || — || align=right | 4.3 km || 
|-id=789 bgcolor=#FFC2E0
| 53789 ||  || — || March 10, 2000 || Socorro || LINEAR || APO +1kmPHA || align=right data-sort-value="0.84" | 840 m || 
|-id=790 bgcolor=#d6d6d6
| 53790 ||  || — || March 11, 2000 || Anderson Mesa || LONEOS || — || align=right | 4.1 km || 
|-id=791 bgcolor=#fefefe
| 53791 ||  || — || March 11, 2000 || Anderson Mesa || LONEOS || V || align=right | 1.6 km || 
|-id=792 bgcolor=#fefefe
| 53792 ||  || — || March 8, 2000 || Kitt Peak || Spacewatch || FLO || align=right | 2.3 km || 
|-id=793 bgcolor=#fefefe
| 53793 ||  || — || March 8, 2000 || Haleakala || NEAT || — || align=right | 2.0 km || 
|-id=794 bgcolor=#fefefe
| 53794 ||  || — || March 8, 2000 || Haleakala || NEAT || — || align=right | 2.0 km || 
|-id=795 bgcolor=#d6d6d6
| 53795 ||  || — || March 8, 2000 || Haleakala || NEAT || TEL || align=right | 4.6 km || 
|-id=796 bgcolor=#fefefe
| 53796 ||  || — || March 8, 2000 || Haleakala || NEAT || — || align=right | 1.7 km || 
|-id=797 bgcolor=#E9E9E9
| 53797 ||  || — || March 8, 2000 || Haleakala || NEAT || CLO || align=right | 4.2 km || 
|-id=798 bgcolor=#fefefe
| 53798 ||  || — || March 9, 2000 || Socorro || LINEAR || V || align=right | 2.4 km || 
|-id=799 bgcolor=#fefefe
| 53799 ||  || — || March 11, 2000 || Anderson Mesa || LONEOS || — || align=right | 4.5 km || 
|-id=800 bgcolor=#fefefe
| 53800 ||  || — || March 11, 2000 || Anderson Mesa || LONEOS || — || align=right | 1.8 km || 
|}

53801–53900 

|-bgcolor=#fefefe
| 53801 ||  || — || March 11, 2000 || Anderson Mesa || LONEOS || V || align=right | 2.1 km || 
|-id=802 bgcolor=#E9E9E9
| 53802 ||  || — || March 11, 2000 || Anderson Mesa || LONEOS || — || align=right | 4.1 km || 
|-id=803 bgcolor=#E9E9E9
| 53803 ||  || — || March 11, 2000 || Anderson Mesa || LONEOS || GEF || align=right | 3.1 km || 
|-id=804 bgcolor=#fefefe
| 53804 ||  || — || March 11, 2000 || Anderson Mesa || LONEOS || — || align=right | 2.1 km || 
|-id=805 bgcolor=#fefefe
| 53805 ||  || — || March 11, 2000 || Anderson Mesa || LONEOS || NYS || align=right | 1.9 km || 
|-id=806 bgcolor=#fefefe
| 53806 ||  || — || March 11, 2000 || Anderson Mesa || LONEOS || — || align=right | 2.0 km || 
|-id=807 bgcolor=#fefefe
| 53807 ||  || — || March 11, 2000 || Anderson Mesa || LONEOS || NYS || align=right | 1.7 km || 
|-id=808 bgcolor=#fefefe
| 53808 ||  || — || March 11, 2000 || Socorro || LINEAR || — || align=right | 2.9 km || 
|-id=809 bgcolor=#fefefe
| 53809 ||  || — || March 11, 2000 || Anderson Mesa || LONEOS || V || align=right | 1.5 km || 
|-id=810 bgcolor=#E9E9E9
| 53810 ||  || — || March 11, 2000 || Anderson Mesa || LONEOS || — || align=right | 5.5 km || 
|-id=811 bgcolor=#fefefe
| 53811 ||  || — || March 11, 2000 || Anderson Mesa || LONEOS || V || align=right | 1.6 km || 
|-id=812 bgcolor=#E9E9E9
| 53812 ||  || — || March 12, 2000 || Socorro || LINEAR || ADE || align=right | 8.2 km || 
|-id=813 bgcolor=#fefefe
| 53813 ||  || — || March 12, 2000 || Socorro || LINEAR || — || align=right | 2.9 km || 
|-id=814 bgcolor=#fefefe
| 53814 ||  || — || March 12, 2000 || Farpoint || Farpoint Obs. || — || align=right | 3.4 km || 
|-id=815 bgcolor=#fefefe
| 53815 ||  || — || March 9, 2000 || Socorro || LINEAR || — || align=right | 4.6 km || 
|-id=816 bgcolor=#E9E9E9
| 53816 ||  || — || March 9, 2000 || Socorro || LINEAR || — || align=right | 7.6 km || 
|-id=817 bgcolor=#E9E9E9
| 53817 ||  || — || March 11, 2000 || Catalina || CSS || — || align=right | 7.8 km || 
|-id=818 bgcolor=#E9E9E9
| 53818 ||  || — || March 11, 2000 || Catalina || CSS || — || align=right | 3.8 km || 
|-id=819 bgcolor=#d6d6d6
| 53819 ||  || — || March 12, 2000 || Catalina || CSS || — || align=right | 6.9 km || 
|-id=820 bgcolor=#fefefe
| 53820 ||  || — || March 14, 2000 || Catalina || CSS || — || align=right | 1.8 km || 
|-id=821 bgcolor=#fefefe
| 53821 ||  || — || March 3, 2000 || Catalina || CSS || — || align=right | 2.1 km || 
|-id=822 bgcolor=#fefefe
| 53822 ||  || — || March 3, 2000 || Catalina || CSS || NYS || align=right | 2.1 km || 
|-id=823 bgcolor=#fefefe
| 53823 ||  || — || March 3, 2000 || Catalina || CSS || — || align=right | 1.9 km || 
|-id=824 bgcolor=#fefefe
| 53824 ||  || — || March 3, 2000 || Haleakala || NEAT || V || align=right | 1.7 km || 
|-id=825 bgcolor=#E9E9E9
| 53825 ||  || — || March 4, 2000 || Catalina || CSS || — || align=right | 2.2 km || 
|-id=826 bgcolor=#fefefe
| 53826 ||  || — || March 4, 2000 || Catalina || CSS || FLO || align=right | 2.0 km || 
|-id=827 bgcolor=#fefefe
| 53827 ||  || — || March 5, 2000 || Socorro || LINEAR || — || align=right | 2.3 km || 
|-id=828 bgcolor=#E9E9E9
| 53828 ||  || — || March 9, 2000 || Socorro || LINEAR || — || align=right | 7.4 km || 
|-id=829 bgcolor=#fefefe
| 53829 ||  || — || March 10, 2000 || Catalina || CSS || — || align=right | 2.8 km || 
|-id=830 bgcolor=#E9E9E9
| 53830 ||  || — || March 11, 2000 || Catalina || CSS || EUN || align=right | 4.5 km || 
|-id=831 bgcolor=#E9E9E9
| 53831 ||  || — || March 12, 2000 || Anderson Mesa || LONEOS || — || align=right | 3.0 km || 
|-id=832 bgcolor=#fefefe
| 53832 ||  || — || March 12, 2000 || Anderson Mesa || LONEOS || — || align=right | 3.3 km || 
|-id=833 bgcolor=#fefefe
| 53833 ||  || — || March 3, 2000 || Socorro || LINEAR || — || align=right | 2.6 km || 
|-id=834 bgcolor=#E9E9E9
| 53834 ||  || — || March 4, 2000 || Socorro || LINEAR || — || align=right | 4.2 km || 
|-id=835 bgcolor=#E9E9E9
| 53835 ||  || — || March 4, 2000 || Socorro || LINEAR || — || align=right | 4.1 km || 
|-id=836 bgcolor=#E9E9E9
| 53836 ||  || — || March 5, 2000 || Socorro || LINEAR || — || align=right | 5.5 km || 
|-id=837 bgcolor=#fefefe
| 53837 ||  || — || March 5, 2000 || Haleakala || NEAT || — || align=right | 1.9 km || 
|-id=838 bgcolor=#fefefe
| 53838 ||  || — || March 3, 2000 || Socorro || LINEAR || MAS || align=right | 1.7 km || 
|-id=839 bgcolor=#fefefe
| 53839 ||  || — || March 1, 2000 || Catalina || CSS || FLO || align=right | 2.1 km || 
|-id=840 bgcolor=#fefefe
| 53840 ||  || — || March 1, 2000 || Catalina || CSS || — || align=right | 2.4 km || 
|-id=841 bgcolor=#fefefe
| 53841 || 2000 FX || — || March 26, 2000 || Prescott || P. G. Comba || NYS || align=right | 5.3 km || 
|-id=842 bgcolor=#fefefe
| 53842 ||  || — || March 30, 2000 || Kitt Peak || Spacewatch || NYS || align=right | 1.1 km || 
|-id=843 bgcolor=#fefefe
| 53843 Antjiekrog ||  ||  || March 30, 2000 || Colleverde || Colleverde Obs. || — || align=right | 6.8 km || 
|-id=844 bgcolor=#E9E9E9
| 53844 ||  || — || March 28, 2000 || Socorro || LINEAR || EUN || align=right | 3.7 km || 
|-id=845 bgcolor=#E9E9E9
| 53845 ||  || — || March 28, 2000 || Socorro || LINEAR || — || align=right | 8.1 km || 
|-id=846 bgcolor=#E9E9E9
| 53846 ||  || — || March 29, 2000 || Socorro || LINEAR || — || align=right | 2.9 km || 
|-id=847 bgcolor=#E9E9E9
| 53847 ||  || — || March 29, 2000 || Socorro || LINEAR || — || align=right | 2.9 km || 
|-id=848 bgcolor=#d6d6d6
| 53848 ||  || — || March 29, 2000 || Socorro || LINEAR || — || align=right | 11 km || 
|-id=849 bgcolor=#fefefe
| 53849 ||  || — || March 28, 2000 || Socorro || LINEAR || FLO || align=right | 1.7 km || 
|-id=850 bgcolor=#fefefe
| 53850 ||  || — || March 28, 2000 || Socorro || LINEAR || V || align=right | 1.7 km || 
|-id=851 bgcolor=#E9E9E9
| 53851 ||  || — || March 28, 2000 || Socorro || LINEAR || EUN || align=right | 4.6 km || 
|-id=852 bgcolor=#fefefe
| 53852 ||  || — || March 29, 2000 || Socorro || LINEAR || FLO || align=right | 1.7 km || 
|-id=853 bgcolor=#E9E9E9
| 53853 ||  || — || March 29, 2000 || Socorro || LINEAR || GEF || align=right | 2.7 km || 
|-id=854 bgcolor=#fefefe
| 53854 ||  || — || March 29, 2000 || Socorro || LINEAR || — || align=right | 3.5 km || 
|-id=855 bgcolor=#fefefe
| 53855 ||  || — || March 29, 2000 || Socorro || LINEAR || V || align=right | 2.1 km || 
|-id=856 bgcolor=#fefefe
| 53856 ||  || — || March 29, 2000 || Socorro || LINEAR || — || align=right | 4.0 km || 
|-id=857 bgcolor=#E9E9E9
| 53857 ||  || — || March 29, 2000 || Socorro || LINEAR || — || align=right | 8.3 km || 
|-id=858 bgcolor=#fefefe
| 53858 ||  || — || March 29, 2000 || Socorro || LINEAR || — || align=right | 1.5 km || 
|-id=859 bgcolor=#E9E9E9
| 53859 ||  || — || March 29, 2000 || Socorro || LINEAR || — || align=right | 4.7 km || 
|-id=860 bgcolor=#fefefe
| 53860 ||  || — || March 27, 2000 || Anderson Mesa || LONEOS || — || align=right | 1.9 km || 
|-id=861 bgcolor=#fefefe
| 53861 ||  || — || March 27, 2000 || Anderson Mesa || LONEOS || — || align=right | 2.3 km || 
|-id=862 bgcolor=#E9E9E9
| 53862 ||  || — || March 27, 2000 || Anderson Mesa || LONEOS || HEN || align=right | 3.4 km || 
|-id=863 bgcolor=#fefefe
| 53863 ||  || — || March 27, 2000 || Anderson Mesa || LONEOS || NYS || align=right | 2.4 km || 
|-id=864 bgcolor=#fefefe
| 53864 ||  || — || March 27, 2000 || Anderson Mesa || LONEOS || FLO || align=right | 2.1 km || 
|-id=865 bgcolor=#E9E9E9
| 53865 ||  || — || March 27, 2000 || Anderson Mesa || LONEOS || — || align=right | 3.0 km || 
|-id=866 bgcolor=#fefefe
| 53866 ||  || — || March 27, 2000 || Anderson Mesa || LONEOS || — || align=right | 2.0 km || 
|-id=867 bgcolor=#E9E9E9
| 53867 ||  || — || March 27, 2000 || Anderson Mesa || LONEOS || — || align=right | 2.9 km || 
|-id=868 bgcolor=#fefefe
| 53868 ||  || — || March 27, 2000 || Anderson Mesa || LONEOS || NYS || align=right | 2.6 km || 
|-id=869 bgcolor=#E9E9E9
| 53869 ||  || — || March 27, 2000 || Anderson Mesa || LONEOS || — || align=right | 2.3 km || 
|-id=870 bgcolor=#fefefe
| 53870 ||  || — || March 27, 2000 || Anderson Mesa || LONEOS || — || align=right | 3.7 km || 
|-id=871 bgcolor=#fefefe
| 53871 ||  || — || March 28, 2000 || Socorro || LINEAR || — || align=right | 3.1 km || 
|-id=872 bgcolor=#fefefe
| 53872 ||  || — || March 29, 2000 || Socorro || LINEAR || FLO || align=right | 1.9 km || 
|-id=873 bgcolor=#fefefe
| 53873 ||  || — || March 29, 2000 || Socorro || LINEAR || V || align=right | 1.5 km || 
|-id=874 bgcolor=#E9E9E9
| 53874 ||  || — || March 29, 2000 || Socorro || LINEAR || MAR || align=right | 4.5 km || 
|-id=875 bgcolor=#d6d6d6
| 53875 ||  || — || March 29, 2000 || Socorro || LINEAR || — || align=right | 8.3 km || 
|-id=876 bgcolor=#fefefe
| 53876 ||  || — || March 29, 2000 || Socorro || LINEAR || — || align=right | 2.6 km || 
|-id=877 bgcolor=#fefefe
| 53877 ||  || — || March 29, 2000 || Socorro || LINEAR || — || align=right | 1.8 km || 
|-id=878 bgcolor=#E9E9E9
| 53878 ||  || — || March 29, 2000 || Socorro || LINEAR || — || align=right | 4.3 km || 
|-id=879 bgcolor=#E9E9E9
| 53879 ||  || — || March 29, 2000 || Socorro || LINEAR || KAZ || align=right | 4.4 km || 
|-id=880 bgcolor=#E9E9E9
| 53880 ||  || — || March 29, 2000 || Socorro || LINEAR || — || align=right | 3.7 km || 
|-id=881 bgcolor=#fefefe
| 53881 ||  || — || March 29, 2000 || Socorro || LINEAR || V || align=right | 2.0 km || 
|-id=882 bgcolor=#fefefe
| 53882 ||  || — || March 29, 2000 || Socorro || LINEAR || V || align=right | 2.0 km || 
|-id=883 bgcolor=#fefefe
| 53883 ||  || — || March 29, 2000 || Socorro || LINEAR || — || align=right | 1.8 km || 
|-id=884 bgcolor=#fefefe
| 53884 ||  || — || March 29, 2000 || Socorro || LINEAR || — || align=right | 2.5 km || 
|-id=885 bgcolor=#fefefe
| 53885 ||  || — || March 29, 2000 || Socorro || LINEAR || FLO || align=right | 2.0 km || 
|-id=886 bgcolor=#E9E9E9
| 53886 ||  || — || March 29, 2000 || Socorro || LINEAR || — || align=right | 3.5 km || 
|-id=887 bgcolor=#E9E9E9
| 53887 ||  || — || March 29, 2000 || Socorro || LINEAR || — || align=right | 2.7 km || 
|-id=888 bgcolor=#fefefe
| 53888 ||  || — || March 29, 2000 || Socorro || LINEAR || V || align=right | 2.6 km || 
|-id=889 bgcolor=#fefefe
| 53889 ||  || — || March 29, 2000 || Socorro || LINEAR || — || align=right | 2.1 km || 
|-id=890 bgcolor=#fefefe
| 53890 ||  || — || March 29, 2000 || Socorro || LINEAR || FLO || align=right | 2.8 km || 
|-id=891 bgcolor=#fefefe
| 53891 ||  || — || March 29, 2000 || Socorro || LINEAR || — || align=right | 2.9 km || 
|-id=892 bgcolor=#fefefe
| 53892 ||  || — || March 28, 2000 || Socorro || LINEAR || FLO || align=right | 1.8 km || 
|-id=893 bgcolor=#fefefe
| 53893 ||  || — || March 29, 2000 || Socorro || LINEAR || — || align=right | 2.1 km || 
|-id=894 bgcolor=#fefefe
| 53894 ||  || — || March 29, 2000 || Socorro || LINEAR || V || align=right | 1.6 km || 
|-id=895 bgcolor=#fefefe
| 53895 ||  || — || March 29, 2000 || Socorro || LINEAR || V || align=right | 1.8 km || 
|-id=896 bgcolor=#fefefe
| 53896 ||  || — || March 29, 2000 || Socorro || LINEAR || — || align=right | 1.5 km || 
|-id=897 bgcolor=#fefefe
| 53897 ||  || — || March 29, 2000 || Socorro || LINEAR || — || align=right | 2.2 km || 
|-id=898 bgcolor=#fefefe
| 53898 ||  || — || March 30, 2000 || Socorro || LINEAR || V || align=right | 2.7 km || 
|-id=899 bgcolor=#fefefe
| 53899 ||  || — || March 30, 2000 || Socorro || LINEAR || — || align=right | 1.9 km || 
|-id=900 bgcolor=#fefefe
| 53900 ||  || — || March 30, 2000 || Socorro || LINEAR || — || align=right | 3.0 km || 
|}

53901–54000 

|-bgcolor=#fefefe
| 53901 ||  || — || March 30, 2000 || Socorro || LINEAR || — || align=right | 3.7 km || 
|-id=902 bgcolor=#fefefe
| 53902 ||  || — || March 29, 2000 || Kitt Peak || Spacewatch || MAS || align=right | 1.3 km || 
|-id=903 bgcolor=#fefefe
| 53903 ||  || — || March 29, 2000 || Socorro || LINEAR || — || align=right | 1.9 km || 
|-id=904 bgcolor=#E9E9E9
| 53904 ||  || — || March 29, 2000 || Socorro || LINEAR || — || align=right | 2.3 km || 
|-id=905 bgcolor=#fefefe
| 53905 ||  || — || March 29, 2000 || Socorro || LINEAR || — || align=right | 1.7 km || 
|-id=906 bgcolor=#E9E9E9
| 53906 ||  || — || March 29, 2000 || Socorro || LINEAR || — || align=right | 4.2 km || 
|-id=907 bgcolor=#fefefe
| 53907 ||  || — || April 2, 2000 || Socorro || LINEAR || V || align=right | 2.4 km || 
|-id=908 bgcolor=#fefefe
| 53908 ||  || — || April 3, 2000 || Socorro || LINEAR || V || align=right | 1.9 km || 
|-id=909 bgcolor=#fefefe
| 53909 ||  || — || April 5, 2000 || Fountain Hills || C. W. Juels || NYS || align=right | 2.7 km || 
|-id=910 bgcolor=#fefefe
| 53910 Jánfischer ||  ||  || April 6, 2000 || Modra || L. Kornoš, D. Kalmančok || — || align=right | 3.8 km || 
|-id=911 bgcolor=#fefefe
| 53911 ||  || — || April 3, 2000 || Socorro || LINEAR || — || align=right | 1.7 km || 
|-id=912 bgcolor=#fefefe
| 53912 ||  || — || April 4, 2000 || Socorro || LINEAR || V || align=right | 1.4 km || 
|-id=913 bgcolor=#fefefe
| 53913 ||  || — || April 4, 2000 || Socorro || LINEAR || V || align=right | 1.9 km || 
|-id=914 bgcolor=#fefefe
| 53914 ||  || — || April 4, 2000 || Socorro || LINEAR || V || align=right | 2.4 km || 
|-id=915 bgcolor=#fefefe
| 53915 ||  || — || April 4, 2000 || Socorro || LINEAR || — || align=right | 2.1 km || 
|-id=916 bgcolor=#fefefe
| 53916 ||  || — || April 4, 2000 || Socorro || LINEAR || — || align=right | 3.6 km || 
|-id=917 bgcolor=#fefefe
| 53917 ||  || — || April 5, 2000 || Socorro || LINEAR || V || align=right | 1.4 km || 
|-id=918 bgcolor=#fefefe
| 53918 ||  || — || April 5, 2000 || Socorro || LINEAR || NYS || align=right | 4.5 km || 
|-id=919 bgcolor=#d6d6d6
| 53919 ||  || — || April 5, 2000 || Socorro || LINEAR || — || align=right | 3.8 km || 
|-id=920 bgcolor=#fefefe
| 53920 ||  || — || April 5, 2000 || Socorro || LINEAR || — || align=right | 2.6 km || 
|-id=921 bgcolor=#d6d6d6
| 53921 ||  || — || April 5, 2000 || Socorro || LINEAR || 628 || align=right | 4.9 km || 
|-id=922 bgcolor=#E9E9E9
| 53922 ||  || — || April 5, 2000 || Socorro || LINEAR || — || align=right | 5.8 km || 
|-id=923 bgcolor=#fefefe
| 53923 ||  || — || April 5, 2000 || Socorro || LINEAR || NYS || align=right | 2.5 km || 
|-id=924 bgcolor=#E9E9E9
| 53924 ||  || — || April 5, 2000 || Socorro || LINEAR || — || align=right | 6.0 km || 
|-id=925 bgcolor=#E9E9E9
| 53925 ||  || — || April 5, 2000 || Socorro || LINEAR || — || align=right | 3.0 km || 
|-id=926 bgcolor=#fefefe
| 53926 ||  || — || April 5, 2000 || Socorro || LINEAR || — || align=right | 3.3 km || 
|-id=927 bgcolor=#E9E9E9
| 53927 ||  || — || April 5, 2000 || Socorro || LINEAR || — || align=right | 6.0 km || 
|-id=928 bgcolor=#fefefe
| 53928 ||  || — || April 5, 2000 || Socorro || LINEAR || — || align=right | 1.7 km || 
|-id=929 bgcolor=#E9E9E9
| 53929 ||  || — || April 5, 2000 || Socorro || LINEAR || — || align=right | 3.4 km || 
|-id=930 bgcolor=#fefefe
| 53930 ||  || — || April 5, 2000 || Socorro || LINEAR || V || align=right | 1.5 km || 
|-id=931 bgcolor=#fefefe
| 53931 ||  || — || April 5, 2000 || Socorro || LINEAR || NYS || align=right | 1.8 km || 
|-id=932 bgcolor=#E9E9E9
| 53932 ||  || — || April 5, 2000 || Socorro || LINEAR || — || align=right | 4.7 km || 
|-id=933 bgcolor=#d6d6d6
| 53933 ||  || — || April 5, 2000 || Socorro || LINEAR || — || align=right | 5.6 km || 
|-id=934 bgcolor=#E9E9E9
| 53934 ||  || — || April 5, 2000 || Socorro || LINEAR || — || align=right | 2.4 km || 
|-id=935 bgcolor=#E9E9E9
| 53935 ||  || — || April 5, 2000 || Socorro || LINEAR || — || align=right | 2.9 km || 
|-id=936 bgcolor=#fefefe
| 53936 ||  || — || April 5, 2000 || Socorro || LINEAR || MAS || align=right | 1.8 km || 
|-id=937 bgcolor=#fefefe
| 53937 ||  || — || April 5, 2000 || Socorro || LINEAR || V || align=right | 1.6 km || 
|-id=938 bgcolor=#E9E9E9
| 53938 ||  || — || April 5, 2000 || Socorro || LINEAR || — || align=right | 4.9 km || 
|-id=939 bgcolor=#E9E9E9
| 53939 ||  || — || April 5, 2000 || Socorro || LINEAR || — || align=right | 5.4 km || 
|-id=940 bgcolor=#E9E9E9
| 53940 ||  || — || April 5, 2000 || Socorro || LINEAR || — || align=right | 2.4 km || 
|-id=941 bgcolor=#d6d6d6
| 53941 ||  || — || April 5, 2000 || Socorro || LINEAR || BRA || align=right | 3.5 km || 
|-id=942 bgcolor=#E9E9E9
| 53942 ||  || — || April 5, 2000 || Socorro || LINEAR || HEN || align=right | 2.6 km || 
|-id=943 bgcolor=#fefefe
| 53943 ||  || — || April 5, 2000 || Socorro || LINEAR || V || align=right | 1.6 km || 
|-id=944 bgcolor=#fefefe
| 53944 ||  || — || April 5, 2000 || Socorro || LINEAR || — || align=right | 1.8 km || 
|-id=945 bgcolor=#fefefe
| 53945 ||  || — || April 5, 2000 || Socorro || LINEAR || — || align=right | 1.9 km || 
|-id=946 bgcolor=#fefefe
| 53946 ||  || — || April 5, 2000 || Socorro || LINEAR || NYS || align=right | 2.8 km || 
|-id=947 bgcolor=#E9E9E9
| 53947 ||  || — || April 5, 2000 || Socorro || LINEAR || — || align=right | 5.5 km || 
|-id=948 bgcolor=#fefefe
| 53948 ||  || — || April 5, 2000 || Socorro || LINEAR || NYS || align=right | 3.0 km || 
|-id=949 bgcolor=#fefefe
| 53949 ||  || — || April 5, 2000 || Socorro || LINEAR || — || align=right | 2.1 km || 
|-id=950 bgcolor=#fefefe
| 53950 ||  || — || April 5, 2000 || Socorro || LINEAR || — || align=right | 2.2 km || 
|-id=951 bgcolor=#fefefe
| 53951 ||  || — || April 5, 2000 || Socorro || LINEAR || — || align=right | 3.5 km || 
|-id=952 bgcolor=#E9E9E9
| 53952 ||  || — || April 5, 2000 || Socorro || LINEAR || EUN || align=right | 2.9 km || 
|-id=953 bgcolor=#fefefe
| 53953 ||  || — || April 5, 2000 || Socorro || LINEAR || KLI || align=right | 5.2 km || 
|-id=954 bgcolor=#fefefe
| 53954 ||  || — || April 5, 2000 || Socorro || LINEAR || — || align=right | 1.6 km || 
|-id=955 bgcolor=#E9E9E9
| 53955 ||  || — || April 5, 2000 || Socorro || LINEAR || — || align=right | 4.1 km || 
|-id=956 bgcolor=#E9E9E9
| 53956 ||  || — || April 5, 2000 || Socorro || LINEAR || — || align=right | 3.3 km || 
|-id=957 bgcolor=#E9E9E9
| 53957 ||  || — || April 5, 2000 || Socorro || LINEAR || — || align=right | 2.8 km || 
|-id=958 bgcolor=#E9E9E9
| 53958 ||  || — || April 5, 2000 || Socorro || LINEAR || — || align=right | 4.0 km || 
|-id=959 bgcolor=#E9E9E9
| 53959 ||  || — || April 5, 2000 || Socorro || LINEAR || — || align=right | 4.5 km || 
|-id=960 bgcolor=#d6d6d6
| 53960 ||  || — || April 5, 2000 || Socorro || LINEAR || THM || align=right | 6.0 km || 
|-id=961 bgcolor=#fefefe
| 53961 ||  || — || April 5, 2000 || Socorro || LINEAR || NYS || align=right | 2.4 km || 
|-id=962 bgcolor=#d6d6d6
| 53962 ||  || — || April 5, 2000 || Socorro || LINEAR || KOR || align=right | 3.0 km || 
|-id=963 bgcolor=#E9E9E9
| 53963 ||  || — || April 5, 2000 || Socorro || LINEAR || — || align=right | 2.7 km || 
|-id=964 bgcolor=#E9E9E9
| 53964 ||  || — || April 5, 2000 || Socorro || LINEAR || — || align=right | 2.7 km || 
|-id=965 bgcolor=#fefefe
| 53965 ||  || — || April 5, 2000 || Socorro || LINEAR || — || align=right | 1.9 km || 
|-id=966 bgcolor=#E9E9E9
| 53966 ||  || — || April 5, 2000 || Socorro || LINEAR || — || align=right | 2.4 km || 
|-id=967 bgcolor=#fefefe
| 53967 ||  || — || April 5, 2000 || Socorro || LINEAR || — || align=right | 1.6 km || 
|-id=968 bgcolor=#fefefe
| 53968 ||  || — || April 5, 2000 || Socorro || LINEAR || EUT || align=right | 1.5 km || 
|-id=969 bgcolor=#fefefe
| 53969 ||  || — || April 5, 2000 || Socorro || LINEAR || NYS || align=right | 2.0 km || 
|-id=970 bgcolor=#fefefe
| 53970 ||  || — || April 5, 2000 || Socorro || LINEAR || MAS || align=right | 1.7 km || 
|-id=971 bgcolor=#E9E9E9
| 53971 ||  || — || April 5, 2000 || Socorro || LINEAR || — || align=right | 1.9 km || 
|-id=972 bgcolor=#fefefe
| 53972 ||  || — || April 5, 2000 || Socorro || LINEAR || — || align=right | 2.5 km || 
|-id=973 bgcolor=#fefefe
| 53973 ||  || — || April 5, 2000 || Socorro || LINEAR || NYS || align=right | 1.5 km || 
|-id=974 bgcolor=#d6d6d6
| 53974 ||  || — || April 5, 2000 || Socorro || LINEAR || KOR || align=right | 3.3 km || 
|-id=975 bgcolor=#d6d6d6
| 53975 ||  || — || April 5, 2000 || Socorro || LINEAR || — || align=right | 6.3 km || 
|-id=976 bgcolor=#fefefe
| 53976 ||  || — || April 5, 2000 || Socorro || LINEAR || — || align=right | 1.6 km || 
|-id=977 bgcolor=#fefefe
| 53977 ||  || — || April 5, 2000 || Socorro || LINEAR || FLO || align=right | 3.2 km || 
|-id=978 bgcolor=#fefefe
| 53978 ||  || — || April 5, 2000 || Socorro || LINEAR || — || align=right | 2.3 km || 
|-id=979 bgcolor=#E9E9E9
| 53979 ||  || — || April 5, 2000 || Socorro || LINEAR || — || align=right | 6.8 km || 
|-id=980 bgcolor=#fefefe
| 53980 ||  || — || April 5, 2000 || Socorro || LINEAR || FLO || align=right | 3.4 km || 
|-id=981 bgcolor=#fefefe
| 53981 ||  || — || April 5, 2000 || Socorro || LINEAR || V || align=right | 1.5 km || 
|-id=982 bgcolor=#E9E9E9
| 53982 ||  || — || April 5, 2000 || Socorro || LINEAR || — || align=right | 6.8 km || 
|-id=983 bgcolor=#fefefe
| 53983 ||  || — || April 5, 2000 || Socorro || LINEAR || NYS || align=right | 1.6 km || 
|-id=984 bgcolor=#fefefe
| 53984 ||  || — || April 5, 2000 || Socorro || LINEAR || — || align=right | 1.6 km || 
|-id=985 bgcolor=#fefefe
| 53985 ||  || — || April 5, 2000 || Socorro || LINEAR || — || align=right | 3.7 km || 
|-id=986 bgcolor=#E9E9E9
| 53986 ||  || — || April 5, 2000 || Socorro || LINEAR || — || align=right | 3.6 km || 
|-id=987 bgcolor=#fefefe
| 53987 ||  || — || April 5, 2000 || Socorro || LINEAR || — || align=right | 1.4 km || 
|-id=988 bgcolor=#fefefe
| 53988 ||  || — || April 5, 2000 || Socorro || LINEAR || — || align=right | 1.8 km || 
|-id=989 bgcolor=#fefefe
| 53989 ||  || — || April 5, 2000 || Socorro || LINEAR || — || align=right | 1.3 km || 
|-id=990 bgcolor=#fefefe
| 53990 ||  || — || April 6, 2000 || Socorro || LINEAR || — || align=right | 1.8 km || 
|-id=991 bgcolor=#fefefe
| 53991 ||  || — || April 6, 2000 || Socorro || LINEAR || — || align=right | 1.8 km || 
|-id=992 bgcolor=#fefefe
| 53992 ||  || — || April 3, 2000 || Socorro || LINEAR || — || align=right | 1.9 km || 
|-id=993 bgcolor=#E9E9E9
| 53993 ||  || — || April 3, 2000 || Socorro || LINEAR || — || align=right | 4.1 km || 
|-id=994 bgcolor=#fefefe
| 53994 ||  || — || April 3, 2000 || Socorro || LINEAR || — || align=right | 2.1 km || 
|-id=995 bgcolor=#fefefe
| 53995 ||  || — || April 4, 2000 || Socorro || LINEAR || FLO || align=right | 1.6 km || 
|-id=996 bgcolor=#E9E9E9
| 53996 ||  || — || April 4, 2000 || Socorro || LINEAR || GEF || align=right | 2.8 km || 
|-id=997 bgcolor=#E9E9E9
| 53997 ||  || — || April 4, 2000 || Socorro || LINEAR || — || align=right | 7.6 km || 
|-id=998 bgcolor=#fefefe
| 53998 ||  || — || April 4, 2000 || Socorro || LINEAR || — || align=right | 2.4 km || 
|-id=999 bgcolor=#fefefe
| 53999 ||  || — || April 4, 2000 || Socorro || LINEAR || — || align=right | 2.3 km || 
|-id=000 bgcolor=#fefefe
| 54000 ||  || — || April 4, 2000 || Socorro || LINEAR || FLO || align=right | 1.7 km || 
|}

References

External links 
 Discovery Circumstances: Numbered Minor Planets (50001)–(55000) (IAU Minor Planet Center)

0053